= Baima =

Baima may refer to:

== China ==
Baima (simplified Chinese: 白马; traditional Chinese: 白馬 unless otherwise noted) may refer to:

- Baima people, subgroup of Tibetans
- Baima language, language spoken by 10,000 people of Tibetan nationality
- Baima County (班玛县), a county of Golog Prefecture, Qinghai
- Baima Subdistrict, a subdistrict of Yijiang District, Wuhu, Anhui

=== Towns ===
- Baima, Chongqing, in Wulong County, Chongqing
- Baima, Beiliu, in Beiliu, Guangxi
- Baima, Henan, in Dancheng County, Henan
- Baima, Hunan, in Lianyuan, Hunan
- Baima, Nanjing, in Nanjing, Jiangsu
- Baima, Taizhou, Jiangsu, in Taizhou, Jiangsu
- Baima, Leshan, in Leshan, Sichuan
- Baima, Miyi County, in Miyi County, Sichuan
- Baima, Neijiang, in Neijiang, Sichuan
- Baima, Suining, in Suining, Sichuan
- Baima, Xuanhan County, in Xuanhan County, Sichuan
- Baima, Baxoi County (白玛镇), in Baxoi County, Tibet
- Baima, Zhejiang, in Pujiang County, Zhejiang

=== Townships ===
- Baima Township, Gansu, in Huachi County, Gansu
- Baima Township, Guangxi (百马乡), in Dahua Yao Autonomous County, Guangxi
- Baima Township, Hebei, in Yi County, Hebei
- Baima Township, Ningxia, in Zhongning County, Ningxia
- Baima Township, Guang'an, in Guang'an, Sichuan
- Baima Tibetan Ethnic Township, in Pingwu County, Sichuan

== Other places ==
- Baima, Sierra Leone town in Kenema District, Eastern Province, Sierra Leone

== See also ==
- White Horse Temple, or Baima Temple, the first Buddhist temple in China, located near Luoyang, Henan
