= 1998 Chinese local elections =

At least two local elections that directly elect chiefs of township were held in December 1998 in China. Although not considered as a mature democratic process and were not widely known, these two polls were still remarked with historical significance as they resulted in the first popularly elected executive leaders since the founding of the communist state.

== Background ==
The 3rd plenary session of the 11th Central Committee of the Chinese Communist Party (CCP) in 1978 marked the start of reform and opening up, the policy of economic reform. Following the meeting, political reforms were pursued, albeit at a limited scale. On 1 July 1979, the 5th National People's Congress (NPC) enacted election law that regulates the NPC and people's congresses at local level, and a new legislation on local governance that includes expansion of election coverage. Pilot schemes were implemented for the election of county-level people's congresses between late 1979 and early 1980 by the Ministry of Civil Affairs under the directives of the CCP Central Committee, and the first formal election was held during that period. The two legislation were further amended in 1982, 1986, and 1995.^{:8-12} In 1997, the Central Committee asserted that "grass-root regimes and autonomous organisations of townships shall have sound democratic electoral systems". A year later the Law on Organization of Village Committees was implemented, and Sichuan branch of the CCP ordered other cities and townships in March 1998 to follow the precedence of Bazhong, where executives of the city were chosen by "public nomination and selection" mechanism (Chinese: 公推公选). (Note: "Public selection" is not direct election as the chief is eventually selected by the people's congress, although the electorate or ordinary voters may nominate candidates.) In September Sichuan CCP published tentative rules on choosing executives and party seniors in towns and townships, which allows them to be nominated by organisations, public, or self-nomination, or through examinations. Between October and 27 December 1998, all 178 deputy chiefs of the 79 towns and townships in Nanbu County were chosen by the public nomination mechanism.^{:435}

== Nancheng Township ==
Nancheng local election was held on 5 December 1998 to elect the new Chief and Deputy Chief of Nancheng Township, Qingshen County, Sichuan. Incumbent Deputy Chief Shang Zhizhong was elected as the new Chief, while a nonpartisan candidate succeeded Shang as the new deputy.

=== Prelude ===
Following the provincial directive and with the arrangement of the Sichuan CCP, the local governments and party branches of Nancheng Township and Qingshen County, the upper administrative division, started planning the direct election of Nancheng Township chief and deputy chief. An opinion polling was conducted with a total of 750 questionnaire distributed.^{:434–5} Amongst the 723 responses, more than 95% of party executives and 85% of villagers agreed to the elections.^{:376}

As a result, Qingshen County CCP, under the arrangement of the Sichuan CCP, established task force and election committee to materialise the election. Nancheng people's congress adopted three bills (on implementing the trial work of the direct election, the primary election, and the formal election) and a resolution (that confirms an election would be held) on 5 November that provide details of the conduct of the election.^{:376}

=== Electoral system ===
Resolutions adopted set out the eligibility of the election. Candidate of the township chief and the three deputies may be chosen amongst the residents. The chief shall have at least two years of experience as a deputy section head of a department (Chinese: 副科长) or other senior positions in the county's administration; a university degree; a Chinese Communist Party membership, and shall not be aged 40 or above. The deputy chief shall have at least three years of working experience in county's administration, people's organization, or township's administration; have completed high school; and shall not be aged 40 or above, but party membership is not compulsory.^{:440} One of the elected deputy chief shall be a woman and another shall be at most 30 years old. Residents fulfilling these criteria may receive early nomination.^{:376}

Potential nominee may nominate themselves, or be nominated by electorates or recommended by the party. They also need to be vetted by Nancheng and Qingshen CCP before entering the primary, which residents would select two candidates for township chief and four for deputy.^{:440} In the formal election on 5 December, each person is entitled to one vote for township chief, and three votes for deputy chief.^{:376}^{:440}

=== Campaign ===
10 people were nominated for the township chief but two withdrew later, and 5 withdrew amongst the 27 deputy chief nominees. Nancheng party branch then vetted the remaining nominees, approving 4 and 15 nominees for chief and deputy chief election respectively.^{:442} A further screening by Qingshen's official confirmed 3 candidates competing for the chief, and 8 candidates for the deputy chief.^{:377}

A campaigning conference was organised on 19 November at the Nancheng primary school. It was attended by more than 1,000 people including village executives, party seniors, deputies to people's congress, and electorates. Candidates made speeches on "if I were the township chief" or "if I were the township deputy chief", followed by a Q&A session which prompted 18 people asking 27 questions.^{:377}^{:443}

=== Candidates ===
The primary was held on 28 November. Mobile ballot boxes were provided throughout the township. The result was announced on the next day. 14,635 ballot papers were issued, and 14,550 were returned. A total of 14,131 valid votes were counted, and confirmed the final two candidates for the township chief and the final four for the deputy chief.^{:442}

It is known that one of the chief candidate is Shang Zhizhong (Chinese: 商志忠), the incumbent deputy chief. For the deputy chief election, Lu Guirong (Chinese: 鲁桂容) is the female candidate; Yu Zheyun (Chinese: 余泽云) was nominated by the electorates; and Yang Le (Chinese: 杨乐), aged 29, is the only candidate without the communist party membership. Both Yang and Yu were nominated by the villagers.^{:377}

=== Result ===
On 5 December, all 18 constituencies in the township conducted the election simultaneously. The officials announced a total of 14,753 ballot papers were issued, (Note: The total votes do not tally with the combined valid, invalid, and blank votes, with a discrepancy of 25 votes less.) and 14,616 were returned. There were 14,323 valid votes, 293 invalid votes, and 162 blank votes. Shang Zhizhong received 9,611 votes and his rival got 4,197 votes. (Note: The combined votes of the two candidates do not match the reported number of valid votes with 515 votes less.) Shang thus was elected as the new chief.^{:434–5}^{:377} The nonpartisan Yang Le was elected the deputy chief.

1998 Nancheng Township Chief election
| Candidate | Party | Votes | % |
|---|---|---|---|
| Shang Zhizhong | Chinese Communist Party | 9,611 | 67.10 |
| Unknown | Chinese Communist Party | 4,197 | 29.30 |
| | | 515 | 3.60 |
| Total | | 14,323 | 100.00 |
| Valid votes | | 14,323 | 96.92 |
| Invalid/blank votes | | 455 | 3.08 |
| Total votes | | 14,778 | 100.00 |

1998 Nancheng Township Deputy Chief election
| Candidate | Party | Votes | % |
|---|---|---|---|
| Yang Le | Nonpartisan | 10,850 | 75.75 |
| Yu Zheyun | Chinese Communist Party | 10,268 | 71.69 |
| Lu Guirong | Chinese Communist Party | 9,217 | 64.35 |
| Unknown | Chinese Communist Party | 9,072 | 63.34 |
| Total | | 39,407 | 100.00 |
| Valid votes | | 14,323 | 96.92 |
| Invalid/blank votes | | 455 | 3.08 |
| Total votes | | 14,778 | 100.00 |

The election result was reported to the Nancheng people's congress, and the congress resolved not to elect the Chief and Deputy Chief in the first meeting of the session. Elected public officers shall carry out the duties in accordance with the local government's organization law.^{:377}

This is believed to be the first official local election to elect an executive leader in the history of the People's Republic of China.^{:382} However, it was not publicly disclosed and was therefore more obscured than the Buyun election that was held a few weeks later on the New Year's Eve.

=== Party election ===
Days later, Nancheng communists conducted party election as well to elect the new party committee, including the secretary, 3 vice-secretaries, 7 committee members, along with the disciplinary committee secretary and 3 members.^{:377} Members may nominate themselves, or be nominated by party members or public organisations. Nominees were registered with the Organization Department of the county's government, and eligible nominees would become candidates. After giving a campaign speech, party members may cast their votes. Out of 587 electorates, 423 were involved in the nomination, and 536 voted in the party election.^{:199} Incumbent party secretary Li Xuequan (Chinese: 李学权) was re-elected after receiving 462 votes, or 86.2% of total votes cast.

=== Reaction ===
Du Gangjian, former professor at National Academy of Governance, said Nancheng's primary election prevented selection of candidates by a small group of people, and triumphs over other local elections that filter candidates by "votes of elitism block". Du, however, added the mobile voting in the primary election could still be prone to intervention, and criticised the unregulated proxy voting and the insecure secret ballot.^{:445,7}

Zhou Shubin (Chinese: 邹树彬), a political science researcher at the Shenzhen University, said Nancheng held "the earliest and most thorough trial on direct election", but he expressed concern that the people's congress is sidelined. He recommended adopting "incremental democratic" measures for the direct elections by allowing the congresses to play a full role in order to advance township's democratization.

Li Fan (Chinese: 李凡), an independent scholar from the think tank World and China Institute (Chinese: 世界与中国研究所), believes Nancheng election's eligibility requirement and vetting matches the party's reform on executive system, but contradicts the proper procedures for the public to elect an executive leader. Proxy voting and other issues were not addressed due to secrecy and confidentiality of the poll. Li concluded that whilst the election earned innovative achievements, problems remained to be solved.^{:381-2}

In response to the subsequent party election, Yang Jirong (Chinese: 杨继荣), professor of Sichuan communist academy, said it encouraged party members to participate in the building of grassroot democracy, and the two polls fine-tuned the governance by integrating the party's and state's leadership. On the other hand, he noted the election weakened collective leadership, and the public nomination is restricted to party members without including the general public.^{:200-2}

Wang Chuan (Chinese: 王川), deputy organisation minister of Sichuan CCP, said a series of communist's democracy trials, including Nancheng party election, accumulated experiences for "public nomination" of township officials, and deepened confidence in reforming the selection of provincial executives of the party.

=== Aftermath ===
In the Nancheng campaign, Shang proposed a number of targets to be achieved by 2001. For the growth of economy, he sets out the annual growth of GDP to reach at least 10%, industrial output value at 4%, and government's revenue at 15%. He added farmer's share of grain per capita shall be more than 400 kg, annual growth of income per capital at RMB 250, and rate of natural increase controlled at less than 6‰. Researches believed all these goals were completed before 2001.^{:377} The elected administration invested in infrastructure by improving irrigation, developing small towns, and providing all rural villages with electricity, telecommunication, and road connection. Shang remains popular as the township reaches moderate prosperity.^{:378}

== Buyun Township ==
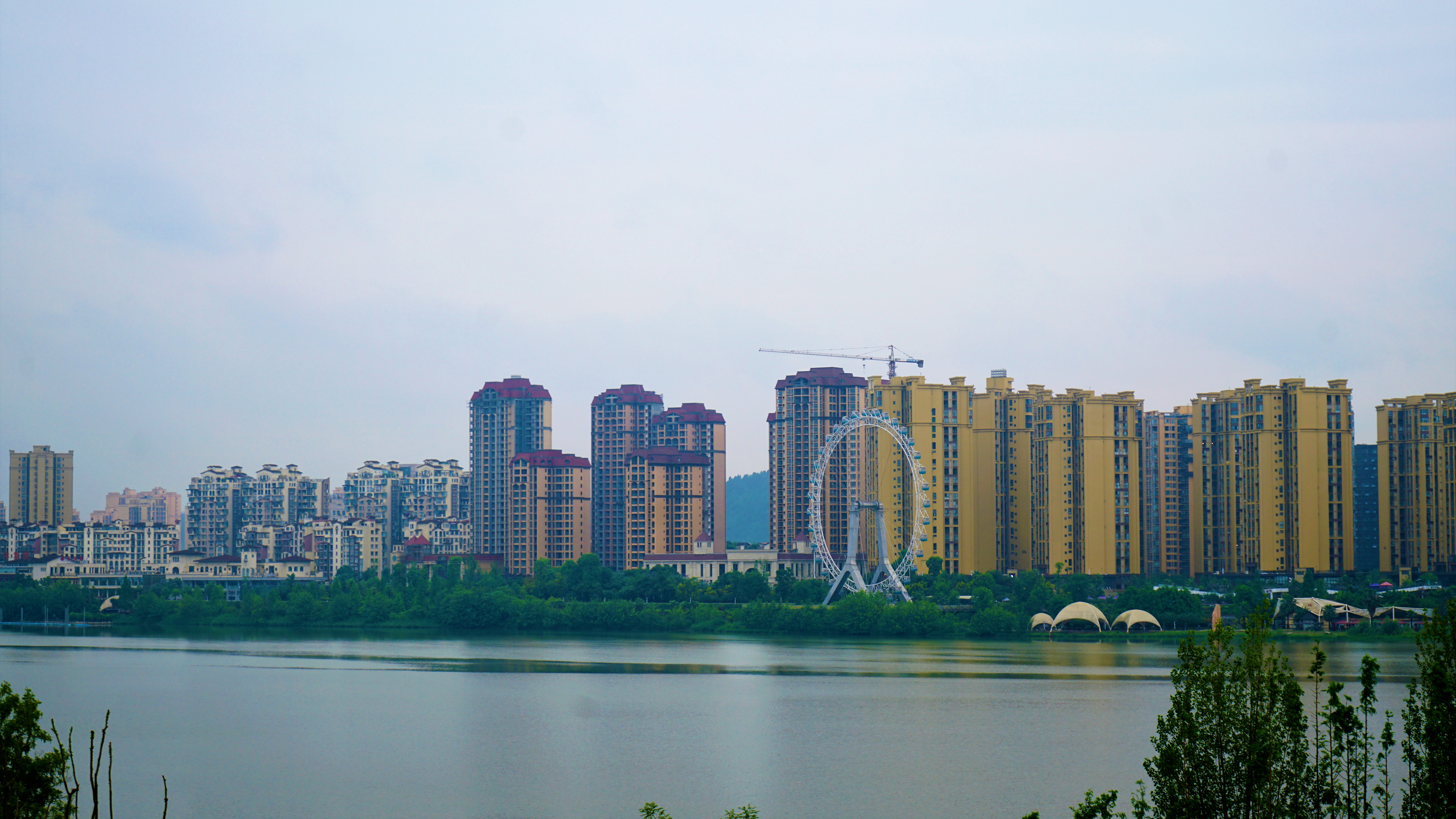
Suining City in 2018

Buyun local election was held on 31 December 1998 to elect the new Chief of Buyun Township, Suining City, Sichuan. Tan Xiaoqiu, the acting Chief backed by the communist, was elected with a majority of votes.

=== Prelude ===
Zhang Jinming (Chinese: 张锦明), the CCP secretary of Shizhong District, Suining City in Sichuan since 1998, faced criticism over the economic troubles endured by the four townships under his administration. Zhang decided to shift the blame and risks by "public selection" of officials. The first was done in April 1998. Residents of Baoshi Town were allowed to vote and decide the candidates for the town chief, followed by the voting by the people's congress to confirm the successor. However, some residents was dissatisfied by the party's backdoor control over the selection. Zhang eventually settled on organising direct election, and decided to hold one in Buyun Township after field researches and discussions. He believed Buyun's remoteness, underdeveloped telecommunication, and limited population allow easier manipulation of the election and prevent possible interference.^{:434}

On 27 November 1998, Buyun CCP requested permission from Shizhong CCP to hold an election for the chief of the township after a series of amendments to the plan, which was granted on the same day. Buyun CCP then established task force and direct-election committee to prepare for the poll.^{:5–6}

=== Electoral system ===
Candidate shall aged 25 or above, completed high school studies, and has been registered as a resident of the township or is working in the township. Political parties, (Note: Although China is a de facto one-party state ruled by the Chinese Communist Party (CCP), there are eight minor political parties, all subservient to the CCP.) people's organizations, and public groups may propose nominations, while at least 30 signatures are required for self nomination. All nominees, except those endorsed by the party, will need to go through a "constituency joint-session consultation" (Chinese: 选区联席会议协商), which will confirm only two nominees as the formal candidates by secret ballot. Party nominees will be directly granted the candidacy. The formal election adopts a two-round system, where any candidates receiving a majority of votes will be elected, or else the top two candidates will enter the second round.^{:49–52}

=== Candidates ===
15 people run in the election, including various senior officials such as Liu Shiguo (Chinese: 刘仕国), then-chairman of Buyun people's congress, and Zhou Kun (Chinese: 邹坤), deputy secretary of Buyun CCP. Tan Xiaoqiu (Chinese: 谭晓秋) was nominated by the CCP and thus confirmed as one of the candidates.^{:46} The remaining two candidates endorsed by the "constituency joint-session consultation" are Zhou Xingyi (Chinese: 周兴义) and Cai Rongfei (Chinese: 蔡荣辉).

Zhou, who won most vote in the preliminary selection, has been a chemistry teacher for a local high school for more than two decades. Cai is from the powerful local clan (Note: At the time of election, 57.1% of Buyun's population surnamed Cai.) and the head of Village 10 after working as a village executive for 20 years. Tan, the incumbent Buyun CCP deputy secretary and the acting Buyun Township Chief, is foreign to the village. A long-time official who had previously served as the deputy chief of Buyun and the nearby Baiyun.^{:46} Tan was approved by the local government and was expected to be formally appointed to the chiefdom, but chose to run in the election following the introduction of the new system.

=== Result ===
Tan won the election with around 51% of votes in the first round, surpassing the threshold of a majority in both valid votes and total votes. (Note: The total vote reported by the official is 6,236, 24 votes more than the reported valid and invalid votes combined.) Officials said no irregularities were found during the voting, and declared Tan was elected the twelfth Chief of Buyun Township. On 4 January 1999, Buyun people's congress adopted resolution that confirmed the validity of the election. Tan, widely recognised as the first popularly elected head of local administration despite after Nancheng election, assumed office afterwards.

1998 Buyun Township Chief election
| Candidate | Party | Votes | % |
|---|---|---|---|
| Tan Xiaoqiu | Chinese Communist Party | 3,130 | 50.94 |
| Zhou Xingyi | Public nomination | 1,995 | 32.47 |
| Cai Rongfei | Public nomination | 1,017 | 16.55 |
| Zhou Kun (write-in) | | 2 | 0.03 |
| Total | | 6,144 | 100.00 |
| Valid votes | | 6,144 | 98.91 |
| Invalid/blank votes | | 68 | 1.09 |
| Total votes | | 6,212 | 100.00 |
| Registered voters/turnout | | 11,349 | 54.74 |

Detailed result
| Constituency | Total votes | Tan | | Zhou X. | | Cai | | Zhou K. | | Invalid |
| Constituency | Total votes | Votes | % | Votes | % | Votes | % | Votes | % | Invalid |
|---|---|---|---|---|---|---|---|---|---|---|
| Village I | 534 | 260 | 48.69 | 211 | 39.51 | 54 | 10.11 | 0 | 0 | 9 |
| Village II | 431 | 195 | 45.24 | 177 | 41.07 | 56 | 12.99 | 0 | 0 | 3 |
| Village III | 492 | 307 | 62.40 | 135 | 27.44 | 49 | 9.96 | 0 | 0 | 1 |
| Village IV | 813 | 536 | 65.93 | 168 | 20.66 | 96 | 11.81 | 0 | 0 | 13 |
| Village V | 513 | 396 | 77.19 | 13 | 2.53 | 104 | 20.27 | 0 | 0 | 0 |
| Village VI | 417 | 124 | 29.74 | 62 | 14.87 | 228 | 54.68 | 0 | 0 | 3 |
| Village VII | 698 | 296 | 42.41 | 214 | 30.66 | 175 | 25.07 | 0 | 0 | 13 |
| Village VIII | 676 | 472 | 69.82 | 92 | 13.61 | 106 | 15.68 | 0 | 0 | 6 |
| Village IX | 530 | 290 | 54.72 | 148 | 27.92 | 85 | 16.04 | 0 | 0 | 7 |
| Village X | 868 | 152 | 17.51 | 680 | 78.34 | 25 | 2.88 | 0 | 0 | 11 |
| Residents' committee, Township Administration | 240 | 102 | 42.50 | 95 | 39.58 | 39 | 16.25 | 2 | 0.83 | 2 |

=== Reaction ===
In contrast to the low profile handling of Nancheng election, various media including West China City Daily and Southern Weekly reported the success of Buyun poll. State media CCTV detailed the election process in a story on 26 February 1999. Buyun is therefore, inaccurately, referred to by the media as the "first Chinese township with a direct election".

The communist party committee of Shizhong, Suining praised the direct election for deepening the relations between the public and the senior officials in local government and party, while "enriching" the officials. During the Chinese People's Political Consultative Conference meeting in March 1999, three motions were proposed which recommended gradually expanding direct elections from Residents' committee to main executives at town/township-level, and permit direct elections for chief of town/township under certain conditions as trials. The motions added direct elections at town/township-level will consolidate the fruits of villagers autonomy and grassroot democracy.

Wu Xiang (Chinese: 吴象), an official at Central Policy Research Office, considered the election as a breakthrough but conceded that it failed to raise attention. Wu believed it could excite ordinary villagers to be enthusiastic and creative and therefore significantly advance political reform if it had been publicised.

Zhao Yunfeng (Chinese: 焦运丰), former chairman of Buyun people's congress, was rather pessimistic and labelled Buyun's democracy as hollow due to a lack of comprehensive reform. Without changes to the mechanism that deviates higher-level policies, he argued, chiefs can hardly play a role; and without strengthening non-governmental groups, there will be no real competitions.

=== Aftermath ===
During Tan's three years in office, Buyun is the only township in Suining without any petitioning. No complaints were received as well against local officials. The survey conducted by Peking University Law School between July 1997 and late 2001 found that, in comparison to national average, Buyun residents were more positive towards elections and more rational when voting for their candidates.^{:236}

Tan was re-elected once and held the office until 2004. But unlike other defeated candidates who were promoted during those six years, Tan had to stay in office as the chief. Cai, who lost to Tan in the election, said Tan in fact suffered because of the election.

== Cancellation ==
Despite receiving appreciations from officials and academics, the chiefdom elections were criticised by the state-owned Legal Daily. The paper cited the Constitution of China and argued elections by the residents are unconstitutional, as "Local people's congresses shall, at their respective levels, elect and have the power to remove from office ... township heads and deputy heads, and town heads and deputy heads." Buyun officials were also criticised by Sichuan authorities and were under pressure from the investigation panel of the National People's Congress.

In the next year, Dapeng Town of Shenzhen in Guangdong adopted the "two-vote system" (Chinese: 两票制) to choose the new chief, although practically there are three rounds of voting. The first round is for residents to propose nominations. Eligible nominees will enter the second round, where a limited franchise will vote for the formal candidate, to be elected by the people's congress in the third round as the new town chief.

Due to unconstitutional concerns, the next 2001 local election in Nancheng adopted the public nomination procedures, where candidates were selected by the residents but voted into office by the people's congress. Buyun followed suit, and reverted to appointment system in 2004 without any public poll. In 2019, Buyun was dissolved and merged into Baima town.

== See also ==
- Elections in China
- Yao Lifa, believed to be the first municipal people's congress deputy elected through self-nomination
