= Shi Minghai =

Chinese Chan Buddhist abbot

- 释明海
- Minghai at the 21st United Nations Day of Vesak Celebration, 2026
- Title: Vice President of the Buddhist Association of China

Personal life
- Born: 1968 (age 57–58) Qianjiang, Hubei, China
- Occupation: Monk; abbot

Religious life
- Religion: Chan Buddhism
- Temple: Bailin Temple (Beijing)
- School: Caodong school
- Lineage: 49th generation of Caodong school

Senior posting
- Teacher: Jinghui

Shi Minghai (Chinese: 释明海; born 1968) is a Chinese Chan Buddhist monk and current Vice President of the Buddhist Association of China, an organization overseen by the United Front Work Department. The abbot of the Bailin Temple in Beijing, Minghai is also the 49th patriarch of the Caodong school of Chan.

== Life ==
Born in Qianjiang in 1968, Minghai graduated from the Department of Philosophy at Peking University in 1991. During his education, he began studying Buddhism and, in 1990, he met the Chan master Jinghui (1933-2013) at Guangji Temple in Beijing. Ordained as a young monk in 1993, Minghai learned under Jinghui, who was then abbot of Bailin Temple and founder of the theory of Living Chan, promoted through magazines and summer camps. Inspired by the teachings of Caogdong and Chan masters like Xuyun, Minghai continued Jinghui's mission of reinvigorating the Bailin Temple and cultivating Chan in daily life as a counterbalance to "quasi-religious" modern materialism.

On May 26, 2026, the 21st United Nations Day of Vesak opened in Wuxi, Jiangsu province, where Minghai represented the Buddhist Association of China and spoke about how Buddhism should preserve its historical traditions in an increasingly globalized world while embracing new innovations and adaptions within China. He also supported the World Buddhist Forum and its facilitation of dialogue among the international sangha.
