= Renmin Road Subdistrict, Shizuishan =

Renmin Road Subdistrict 人民路街道
- Subdistrict
- Location in Ningxia
- Coordinates: 39°1′3″N 106°22′42″E
- Country: China
- Autonomous region: Ningxia
- Prefecture-level city: Shizuishan
- District: Dawukou District
- Time zone: UTC+8 (China Standard Time)

Renmin Road Subdistrict (Chinese: 人民路街道; pinyin: Rénmínlù Jiēdào) is a subdistrict situated in Dawukou District, Shizuishan, Ningxia, China. As of 2020, it administers the following seven residential neighborhoods:

- Jianshe Community (建设社区)
- Gongren Street Community (工人街社区)
- Wenming Community (文明社区)
- Hongxing Community (红星社区)
- Youyidong Street Community (游艺东街社区)
- Dongfang Community (东方社区)
- Minsheng Community (民生社区)

== See also ==
- List of township-level divisions of Ningxia
