= Hongyazi =

Hongyazi (simplified Chinese: 红崖子; traditional Chinese: 紅崖子; pinyin: Hóngyázǐ) may refer to these places in China:

- Hongyazi, Liaoning, a town in Xingcheng, Liaoning
- Hongyazi Township, Pingluo County, Ningxia
