= Bailin Temple =

Bailin Temple, also known as Monastery of the Cypress Grove may refer to:

- Bailin Temple (Beijing) in Dongcheng District, Beijing, near the Yonghe Palace
- Bailin Temple (Hebei) in Zhaoxian County, Hebei, famous for its pagoda
