= Hongyazi Township =

Hongyazi Township 红崖子乡
- Township
- Location within Ningxia Location within China
- Coordinates: 39°1′13″N 106°52′34″E
- Country: China
- Autonomous region: Ningxia
- Prefecture-level city: Shizuishan
- County: Pingluo County
- Time zone: UTC+8 (CST)
- Postal code: 753000
- Area code: 0952

Hongyazi Township (simplified Chinese: 红崖子乡; traditional Chinese: 紅崖子鄉; pinyin: Hóngyázǐ Xiāng) is a primarily sectored township in Pingluo County, Shizuishan, Ningxia, China. As of 2020, Hongyazi Township has jurisdictions over the following seven villages:

- Hongyazi Village
- Wangjiagou Village (王家沟村)
- Wuduizi Village (五堆子村)
- Shuiquanzi Village (水泉子村)
- Sankeliu Village (三棵柳村)
- Hongxiang New Village (红翔新村)
- Hongrui Village (红瑞村)

As of 2008, Hongyazi Village had 1494 people and 416 households, roughly a third of them Hui Muslims. The main crops cultivated were wheat, maize, sunflower seeds and oil, and the average income per capita amounted to $786.
