= Jinghui =

Chinese Chan Buddhist master

Jinghui Fashi
- 净慧法师
- Title: Vice President; Buddhist Association of China

Personal life
- Born: 1933
- Died: 2013 (aged 79–80)
- Occupation: Monk; abbot

Religious life
- Religion: Chan Buddhism
- Temple: Bailin Temple (Beijing)
- School: Caodong school
- Lineage: 48th generation of Caodong

Senior posting
- Teacher: Xuyun
- Students: Shi Minghai

Jinghui (Chinese: 净慧法师; 1933-2013) was a Chinese Chan Buddhist master and abbot of the Bailin Temple in Beijing, China. During his life, he was also the Vice President of Buddhist Association of China and founding President of the Buddhist Association of Hebei. A student of the renowned Chan master Xuyun, Jinghui was the 48th patriarch of the Caodong school.

== Life ==
Ordained in Guangdong, Jinghui trained under the Chan master Xuyun (1840-1959). When Jinghui became the abbot of the Bailin Temple, he worked to revive Buddhism in China by reinvigorating Chan as a part of ordinary life and restore historical temples across the country, the influence spreading to foreign nations like Germany. After developing the theory of Living Chan (sheng huo chan), he worked to teach Chan through magazines and annual summer camps at the Bailin Temple. In 2004, he published the book The Gates of Chan Buddhism based on a series of lectures on the origins and methods of the tradition, along with his sheng huo chan theory.

Jinghui died in 2013. His memorial ceremony was done in the People's Hall of Shijiazhuang in Hebei.
