= COVID-19 pandemic in Ningxia =

- Disease: COVID-19
- Pathogen: SARS-CoV-2
- Location: Ningxia, China
- First outbreak: Wuhan, Hubei
- Arrival date: 2020
- Confirmed cases: 94
- Active cases: 17
- Recovered: 77
- Deaths: 0

The COVID-19 pandemic reached the Ningxia Hui Autonomous Region, China in 2020.

== Statistics ==
Division	Active	Confirmed	Deceased	Recovered
Ningxia	17	94	0	77
Yinchuan	7	45	0	38
Wuzhong, Ningxia	10	38	0	28
Guyuan	0	5	0	5
Zhongwei	0	4	0	4
Shizuishan	0	1	0	1

== Timeline ==
=== 2020 ===
During the period from January 24 to 26, 1 new confirmed case was reported every day.

On January 26, Ningxia newly reported 3 confirmed cases and excluded 1 suspected case.

On January 27, Ningxia newly reported 4 confirmed cases.

On January 28, one new confirmed case was reported in Ningxia

On January 29, Ningxia newly reported 5 confirmed cases.

On January 30, Ningxia newly reported 4 confirmed cases.

On January 31, Ningxia newly reported 5 confirmed cases.

=== May 2021 ===
On May 8, a new confirmed case was added in Yinchuan City. The patient entered Shanghai on April 23. After 14 days of centralized isolation medical observation and three negative nucleic acid tests, he was released from isolation on May 7 and returned to Shanghai from Shanghai. The nucleic acid test result was positive on the first day of his return, and he was diagnosed the next day.

=== July 2021 ===
On July 30, Yinchuan City organized a follow-up investigation of Zhang Moumou, a close contact of a confirmed case in Chengdu, according to the requirements of the relevant provincial and municipal investigation letters. The nucleic acid test was positive, and he was immediately transferred to the Fourth People's Hospital of Ningxia Hui Autonomous Region for isolation diagnosis and treatment. Diagnosed by the diagnosis and treatment expert group as a confirmed case of new coronary pneumonia, the clinical type is common type.

=== 2022 ===
On April 28, Ningxia reported 1 new case of asymptomatic infection of new coronary pneumonia (in Yinchuan, a close contact of an asymptomatic infection who returned to Ningxia after entering the quarantine on April 25).
