= Dawukou, Shizuishan =

Dawukou 大武口区 دَاوُکِو ٿِيُوِ
- County
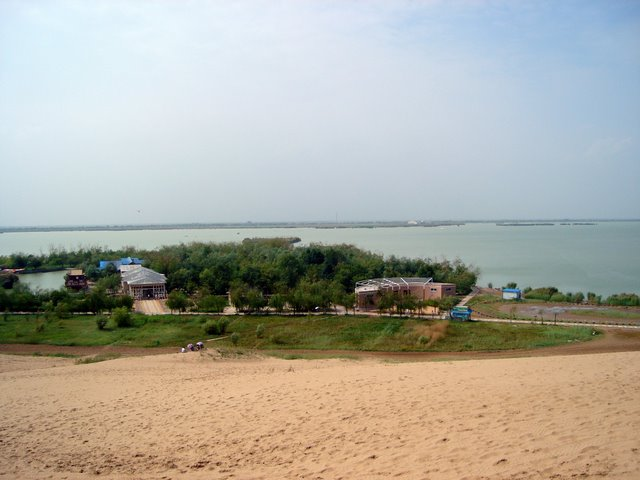

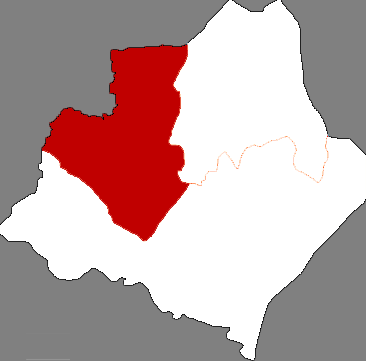
- Dawukou in Shizuishan

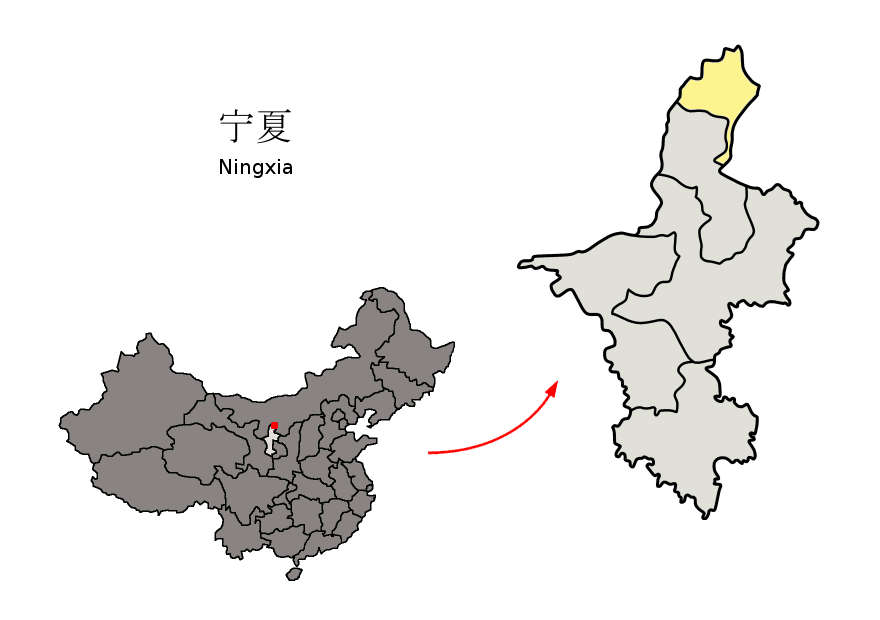
- Shizuishan in Ningxia
- Coordinates: 39°01′08″N 106°22′05″E
- Country: China
- Autonomous region: Ningxia
- Prefecture-level city: Shizuishan
- District seat: Changsheng Subdistrict

Area
  - Total: 949.89 km^{2} (366.75 sq mi)

Population (2020 census)
  - Total: 298,292
  - Density: 314.03/km^{2} (813.33/sq mi)
- Time zone: UTC+8 (China Standard)
- Website: www.dwk.gov.cn

Dawukou District (simplified Chinese: 大武口区; traditional Chinese: 大武口區; pinyin: Dàwǔkǒu Qū; Wade–Giles: Ta-wu-k’ou Ch’ü, Xiao'erjing: دَاوُکِو ٿِيُوِ) is a district and the seat of the city of Shizuishan in the northwest of the Ningxia Hui Autonomous Region of China, bordering Inner Mongolia to the north and northwest. It has a total area of 1,007 km^{2} (389 sq mi), and a population of approximately 230,000 people.

== Characteristics ==
Dawukou District is a well-known industrial region, and it has attracted considerable investment in recent years. The district's main projects vary greatly, and mainly include light polluting or non-polluting industries. The district's postal code is 753000.

== Administrative divisions ==
Dawukou District has 10 subdistricts and 1 town.

10 subdistricts

- Changsheng Subdistrict (长胜街道, چَانْ‌شٍْ ڭِيَ‌دَوْ)
- Chaoyang Subdistrict (朝阳街道, جَوْيَانْ ڭِيَ‌دَوْ)
- Renmin Road Subdistrict (人民路街道, ژٍمٍ لُ ڭِيَ‌دَوْ)
- Changcheng Subdistrict (长城街道, چَانْ‌چٍْ ڭِيَ‌دَوْ)
- Qingshan Subdistrict (青山街道, ٿٍْ‌شًا ڭِيَ‌دَوْ)
- Shitanjing Subdistrict (石炭井街道, شِ‌تًاڭٍْ ڭِيَ‌دَوْ)
- Baijigou Subdistrict (白芨沟街道, بَيْ‌ڭِ‌قِوْ ڭِيَ‌دَوْ)
- Goukou Subdistrict (沟口街道, قِوْکِوْ ڭِيَ‌دَوْ)
- Changxing Subdistrict (长兴街道, چَانْ‌ثٍْ ڭِيَ‌دَوْ)
- Jinlin Subdistrict (锦林街道, ڭٍ‌لٍ ڭِيَ‌دَوْ)

1 town

- Xinghai Town (星海镇)

== Climate ==
Climate data for Shitanjing, Dawukou District, elevation 1,465 m (4,806 ft), (1991–2020 normals)
| Month | Jan | Feb | Mar | Apr | May | Jun | Jul | Aug | Sep | Oct | Nov | Dec | Year |
|---|---|---|---|---|---|---|---|---|---|---|---|---|---|
| Mean daily maximum °C (°F) | −1.6 (29.1) | 2.5 (36.5) | 9.1 (48.4) | 17.0 (62.6) | 22.8 (73.0) | 27.4 (81.3) | 29.3 (84.7) | 27.2 (81.0) | 21.7 (71.1) | 14.8 (58.6) | 6.9 (44.4) | −0.2 (31.6) | 14.7 (58.5) |
| Daily mean °C (°F) | −8.0 (17.6) | −4.0 (24.8) | 2.7 (36.9) | 10.7 (51.3) | 16.8 (62.2) | 21.8 (71.2) | 23.7 (74.7) | 21.7 (71.1) | 15.9 (60.6) | 8.4 (47.1) | 0.7 (33.3) | −6.2 (20.8) | 8.7 (47.6) |
| Mean daily minimum °C (°F) | −13.0 (8.6) | −9.5 (14.9) | −3.2 (26.2) | 3.8 (38.8) | 9.9 (49.8) | 15.3 (59.5) | 17.7 (63.9) | 16.0 (60.8) | 10.2 (50.4) | 2.7 (36.9) | −4.3 (24.3) | −11.0 (12.2) | 2.9 (37.2) |
| Average precipitation mm (inches) | 1.0 (0.04) | 1.5 (0.06) | 3.9 (0.15) | 6.9 (0.27) | 14.6 (0.57) | 27.1 (1.07) | 51.4 (2.02) | 40.0 (1.57) | 28.0 (1.10) | 9.1 (0.36) | 2.9 (0.11) | 1.1 (0.04) | 187.5 (7.36) |
| Average precipitation days (≥ 0.1 mm) | 1.8 | 1.9 | 2.9 | 3.0 | 4.8 | 6.0 | 8.5 | 7.5 | 6.1 | 3.3 | 2.4 | 2.1 | 50.3 |
| Average snowy days | 3.5 | 3.0 | 2.9 | 1.2 | 0.1 | 0 | 0 | 0 | 0 | 1.1 | 2.9 | 3.8 | 18.5 |
| Average relative humidity (%) | 47 | 40 | 35 | 30 | 32 | 38 | 48 | 52 | 53 | 46 | 45 | 46 | 43 |
| Mean monthly sunshine hours | 224.0 | 224.0 | 255.9 | 274.3 | 302.4 | 287.1 | 286.0 | 267.8 | 237.9 | 248.5 | 223.8 | 217.7 | 3,049.4 |
| Percentage possible sunshine | 74 | 73 | 69 | 69 | 68 | 64 | 64 | 64 | 65 | 73 | 75 | 75 | 69 |
Source: China Meteorological Administration
