= Baima Township, Ningxia =

Baima Township 白马乡
- Township
- Location in Ningxia
- Coordinates: 37°37′52″N 105°55′59″E
- Country: People's Republic of China
- Region: Ningxia
- Prefecture-level city: Zhongwei
- County: Zhongning
- Village-level divisions: 7 villages
- Elevation: 1,178 m (3,865 ft)
- Time zone: UTC+8 (China Standard)
- Area code: 0955

Baima Township (simplified Chinese: 白马乡; traditional Chinese: 白馬鄉; pinyin: Báimǎ Xiāng; lit. 'white horse') is a township of Zhongning County on the eastern bank of the Yellow River in central Ningxia, located 2.6 kilometres (1.6 mi) from the river itself and 27 km (17 mi) northeast of the county seat. As of 2020, it has seven villages under its administration:

- Baima Village
- Zhulu Village (朱路村)
- Bailu Village (白路村)
- Sandaohu Village (三道湖村)
- Zhang'en Village (彰恩村)
- Yuejin Village (跃进村)
- Xintian Village (新田村)

== See also ==
- List of township-level divisions of Ningxia
