= Huinong, Shizuishan =

Huinong 惠农区 خُوِنْو ٿِيُوِ
- District
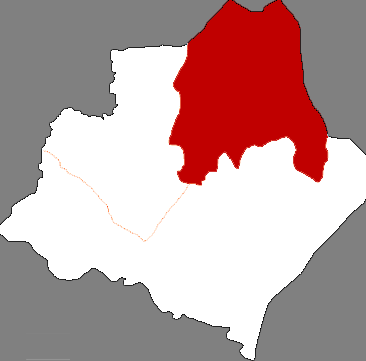
- Huinong in Shizuishan

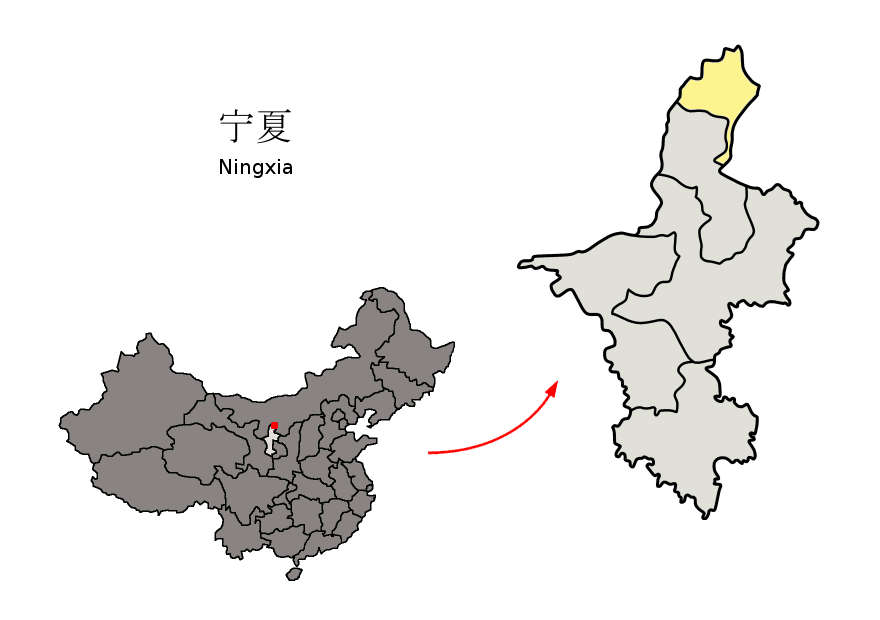
- Shizuishan in Ningxia
- Coordinates: 39°14′21″N 106°46′52″E
- Country: China
- Autonomous region: Ningxia
- Prefecture-level city: Shizuishan
- District seat: Beijie Subdistrict

Area
  - Total: 1,064.79 km^{2} (411.12 sq mi)

Population
  - Total: 185,803
  - Density: 174.497/km^{2} (451.946/sq mi)
- Time zone: UTC+8 (China Standard)

Huinong District (simplified Chinese: 惠农区; traditional Chinese: 惠農區; pinyin: Huìnóng Qū, Xiao'erjing: خُوِنْو ٿِيُوِ) is a district of the city of Shizuishan, in the northernmost part of the Ningxia Hui Autonomous Region, China, bordering Inner Mongolia to the northwest, north, and east. It has a total area of 1088 square kilometers, and a population of approximately 200,000 people.

== Characteristics ==
Huinong District was created from the merger of the former Shizuishan county level city and Huinong County. It is an extremely well known agricultural area, and agricultural products and dehydrated vegetables make up the main part of the district's output. The district is the largest grower and processor of dehydrated vegetables in western China. The district's postal code is 753600.

== Administrative divisions ==
Huinong District has 6 subdistricts, 3 towns and 1 township.

6 subdistricts

- Beijie (北街街道, بِيْ‌ڭِيَ‌ ڭِيَ‌دَوْ)
- Zhongjie (中街街道, جْوڭِيَ‌ ڭِيَ‌دَوْ)
- Nanjie (南街街道, نًاڭِيَ‌ ڭِيَ‌دَوْ)
- Yucailu (育才路街道, ۋِڞَيْ لُ ڭِيَ‌دَوْ)
- Huochezhan (火车站街道, خُوَچَ جًا ڭِيَ‌دَوْ)
- Hebin (河滨街道, حَ‌بٍ ڭِيَ‌دَوْ)

3 towns

- Yuanyi (园艺镇, يُوًاءِ جٍ)
- Weizha (尾闸镇, وِجَا جٍ)
- Hongguozi (红果子镇, خْوقُوَزِ جٍ)

1 township

- Lihe (礼和乡, لِ‌حَ ثِيَانْ)

== Climate ==
Climate data for Huinong District, elevation 1,092 m (3,583 ft), (1991–2020 normals)
Month	Jan	Feb	Mar	Apr	May	Jun	Jul	Aug	Sep	Oct	Nov	Dec	Year
Mean daily maximum °C (°F)	−0.4 (31.3)	4.7 (40.5)	11.8 (53.2)	19.8 (67.6)	25.2 (77.4)	29.3 (84.7)	31.1 (88.0)	29.3 (84.7)	24.1 (75.4)	17.3 (63.1)	8.1 (46.6)	0.9 (33.6)	16.8 (62.2)
Daily mean °C (°F)	−7.4 (18.7)	−2.8 (27.0)	4.5 (40.1)	12.3 (54.1)	18.2 (64.8)	22.7 (72.9)	24.7 (76.5)	22.9 (73.2)	17.2 (63.0)	9.9 (49.8)	1.6 (34.9)	−5.5 (22.1)	9.9 (49.8)
Mean daily minimum °C (°F)	−13.2 (8.2)	−9.1 (15.6)	−2.1 (28.2)	4.9 (40.8)	10.8 (51.4)	15.8 (60.4)	18.6 (65.5)	17.1 (62.8)	11.3 (52.3)	3.6 (38.5)	−3.6 (25.5)	−10.6 (12.9)	3.6 (38.5)
Average precipitation mm (inches)	0.8 (0.03)	1.6 (0.06)	3.7 (0.15)	6.4 (0.25)	14.9 (0.59)	30.0 (1.18)	45.5 (1.79)	32.8 (1.29)	26.8 (1.06)	8.6 (0.34)	3.0 (0.12)	0.3 (0.01)	174.4 (6.87)
Average precipitation days (≥ 0.1 mm)	1.0	1.0	2.0	2.2	4.0	5.9	7.2	7.4	6.2	2.9	1.1	0.6	41.5
Average snowy days	2.6	2.0	1.4	0.4	0	0	0	0	0	0.4	1.8	1.9	10.5
Average relative humidity (%)	49	42	36	32	37	45	54	57	57	50	52	51	47
Mean monthly sunshine hours	210.3	217.6	255.6	272.7	302.8	290.5	282.3	262.3	234.3	242.2	214.2	205.6	2,990.4
Percentage possible sunshine	69	71	68	68	68	65	63	63	64	71	72	71	68
Source: China Meteorological Administration
