= Zhongning County =

Zhongning 中宁县 جْونِئٍ‌ ثِيًا
- County
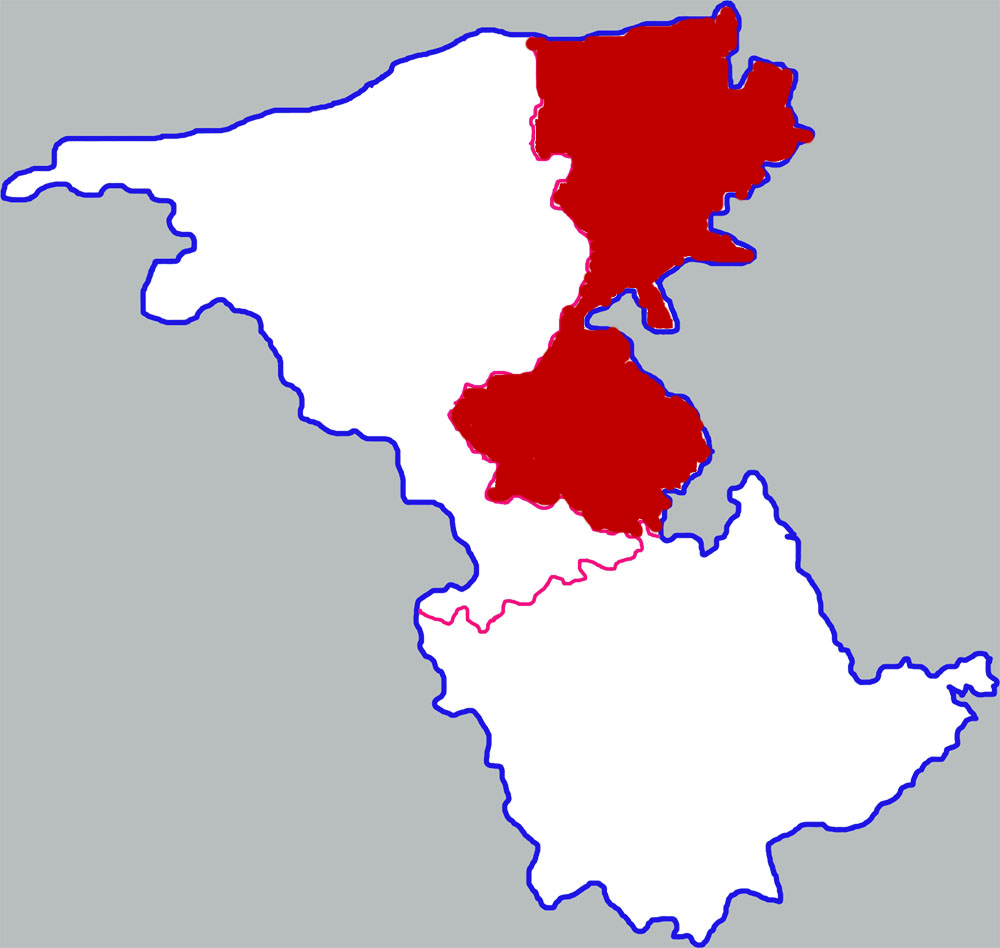
- Zhongning in Zhongwei

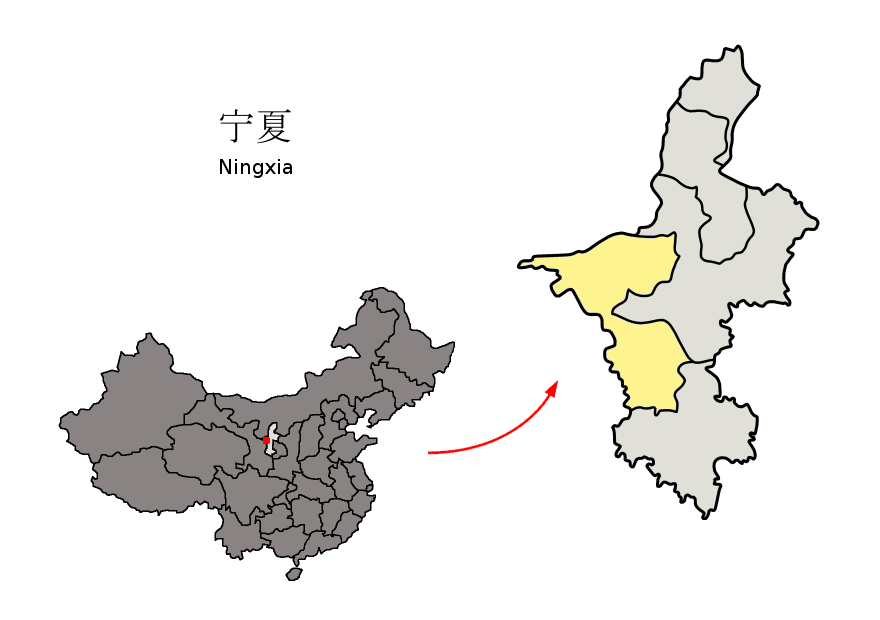
- Zhongwei in Ningxia
- Coordinates (Zhongning government): 37°29′30″N 105°41′06″E
- Country: China
- Autonomous region: Ningxia
- Prefecture-level city: Zhongwei
- County seat: Ning'an

Area
  - Total: 3,280.17 km^{2} (1,266.48 sq mi)

Population
  - Total: 312,921
  - Density: 95.3978/km^{2} (247.079/sq mi)
- Time zone: UTC+8 (China Standard)

Zhongning
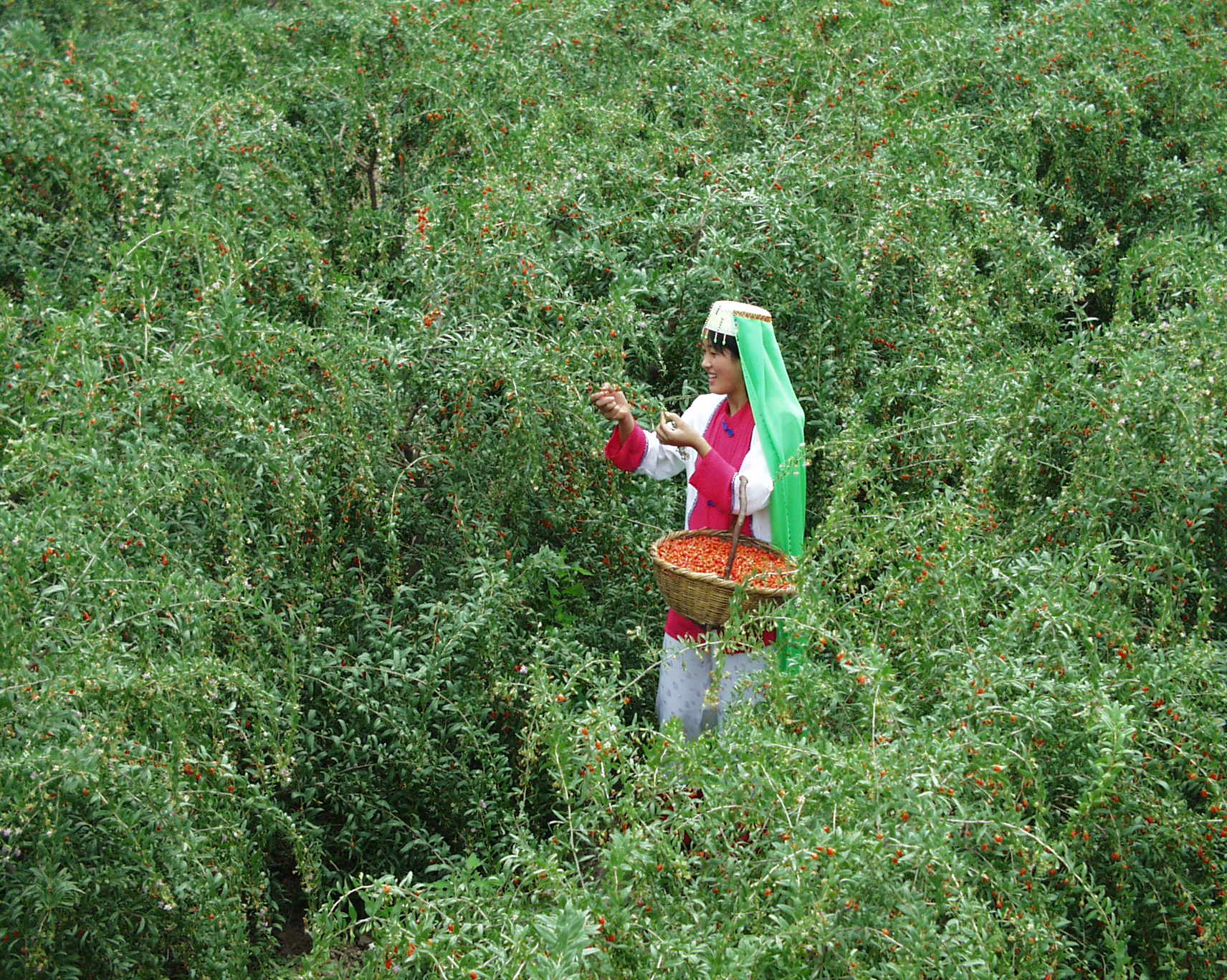
- Wolfberry harvest celebration
- Simplified Chinese: 中宁
- Traditional Chinese: 中寧
- Literal meaning: central peace
Transcriptions
Standard Mandarin
- Hanyu Pinyin: Zhōngníng
- Wade–Giles: Chung-ning
other Mandarin
- Xiao'erjing: جْونِئٍ‌ ثِيًا

Zhongning County is a county under the administration of Zhongwei city in west-central Ningxia Hui Autonomous Region of China, bordering Inner Mongolia to the northwest. It is the point at which the northern twist of the Yellow River begins, creating the Ordos Loop. It has a total area of 2,841 square kilometers (1,097 sq mi), and a population of approximately 410,000 people.

Zhongning County is an agricultural county. In addition to traditional agricultural products, Wolfberries have begun to be cultivated in recent years. However, due to a drought, the growing range for the berries has not significantly increased. The county government is located in the town of Ningan and the county's postal code is 755100.

== Administrative divisions ==
Zhongning County has 6 towns and 6 townships.

6 towns

- Ning'an (宁安镇, نِئٍ‌اً جٍ)
- Enhe (恩和镇, عٍ‌حَ جٍ)
- Xinbao (新堡镇, ثٍ‌بَوْ جٍ)
- Shikong (石空镇, شِ‌کْو جٍ)
- Mingsha (鸣沙镇, مٍْ‌شَا جٍ)
- Dazhanchang (大战场镇, دَاجًاچَانْ جٍ)

6 townships

- Xutao (徐套乡, ثُ‌تَوْ ثِيَانْ)
- Hanjiaoshu (喊叫水乡, خًاڭِيَوْشُ ثِيَانْ)
- Yuding (余丁乡, ۋِدٍ ثِيَانْ)
- Baima (白马乡, بَيْ‌مَا ثِيَانْ)
- Zhouta (舟塔乡, جِوْتَا ثِيَانْ)
- Taiyangliang (太阳梁乡, تَيْ‌يَانْ‌لِيَانْ ثِيَانْ)

== Climate ==
Climate data for Zhongning, elevation 1,181 m (3,875 ft), (1991–2020 normals, extremes 1981–present)
Month	Jan	Feb	Mar	Apr	May	Jun	Jul	Aug	Sep	Oct	Nov	Dec	Year
Record high °C (°F)	18.1 (64.6)	22.7 (72.9)	28.1 (82.6)	35.6 (96.1)	36.6 (97.9)	37.0 (98.6)	37.7 (99.9)	38.0 (100.4)	34.7 (94.5)	30.7 (87.3)	23.7 (74.7)	17.3 (63.1)	38.0 (100.4)
Mean daily maximum °C (°F)	1.4 (34.5)	6.6 (43.9)	13.5 (56.3)	20.8 (69.4)	25.6 (78.1)	29.5 (85.1)	30.9 (87.6)	29.2 (84.6)	24.4 (75.9)	18.2 (64.8)	10.2 (50.4)	3.0 (37.4)	17.8 (64.0)
Daily mean °C (°F)	−6.0 (21.2)	−1.2 (29.8)	5.9 (42.6)	13.2 (55.8)	18.3 (64.9)	22.6 (72.7)	24.4 (75.9)	22.6 (72.7)	17.4 (63.3)	10.4 (50.7)	2.8 (37.0)	−4.0 (24.8)	10.5 (50.9)
Mean daily minimum °C (°F)	−11.3 (11.7)	−7.1 (19.2)	−0.2 (31.6)	6.3 (43.3)	11.3 (52.3)	16.1 (61.0)	18.5 (65.3)	17.1 (62.8)	11.9 (53.4)	4.6 (40.3)	−2.2 (28.0)	−8.9 (16.0)	4.7 (40.4)
Record low °C (°F)	−26.9 (−16.4)	−24.7 (−12.5)	−17.1 (1.2)	−7.7 (18.1)	−3.9 (25.0)	6.5 (43.7)	9.6 (49.3)	6.5 (43.7)	−0.5 (31.1)	−9.8 (14.4)	−16.3 (2.7)	−24.7 (−12.5)	−26.9 (−16.4)
Average precipitation mm (inches)	2.0 (0.08)	1.6 (0.06)	4.7 (0.19)	9.6 (0.38)	18.1 (0.71)	31.0 (1.22)	41.5 (1.63)	41.3 (1.63)	29.3 (1.15)	13.7 (0.54)	3.5 (0.14)	0.5 (0.02)	196.8 (7.75)
Average precipitation days (≥ 0.1 mm)	2.0	1.4	2.1	3.8	4.7	6.6	7.6	7.5	6.9	4.1	1.8	0.8	49.3
Average snowy days	3.0	2.1	1.5	0.4	0	0	0	0	0	0.3	1.7	1.5	10.5
Average relative humidity (%)	49	43	39	37	43	49	57	62	64	59	56	51	51
Mean monthly sunshine hours	205.7	207.7	243.1	261.6	293.4	295.8	292.6	272.1	226.6	234.1	216.5	212.8	2,962
Percentage possible sunshine	67	67	65	66	67	67	66	65	62	68	72	72	67
Source: China Meteorological Administration all-time January high
