= Pingluo County =

Pingluo 平罗县 پِئٍ‌لُوَ ثِيًا
- County
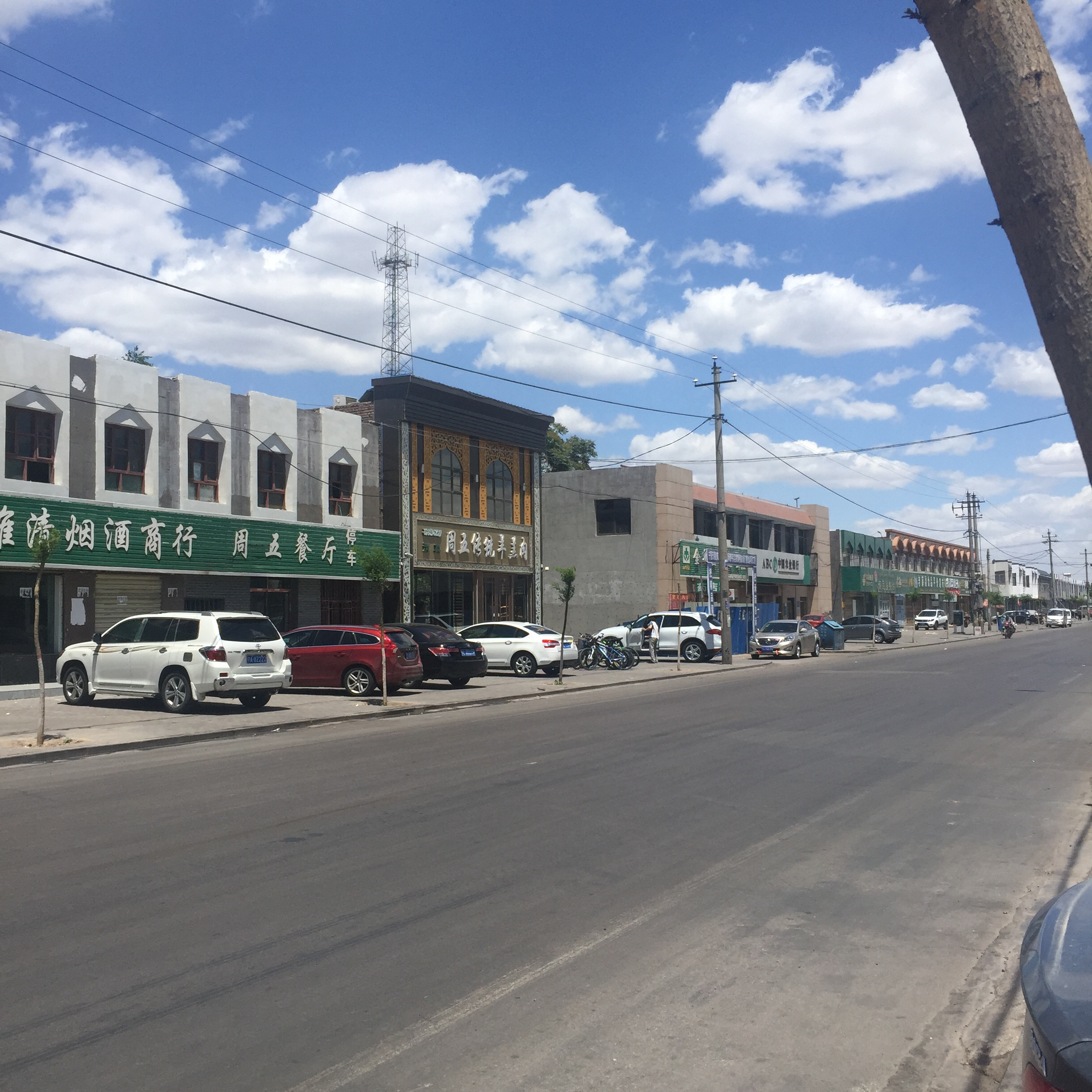

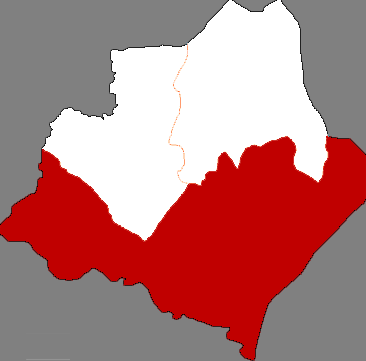
- Pingluo in Shizuishan

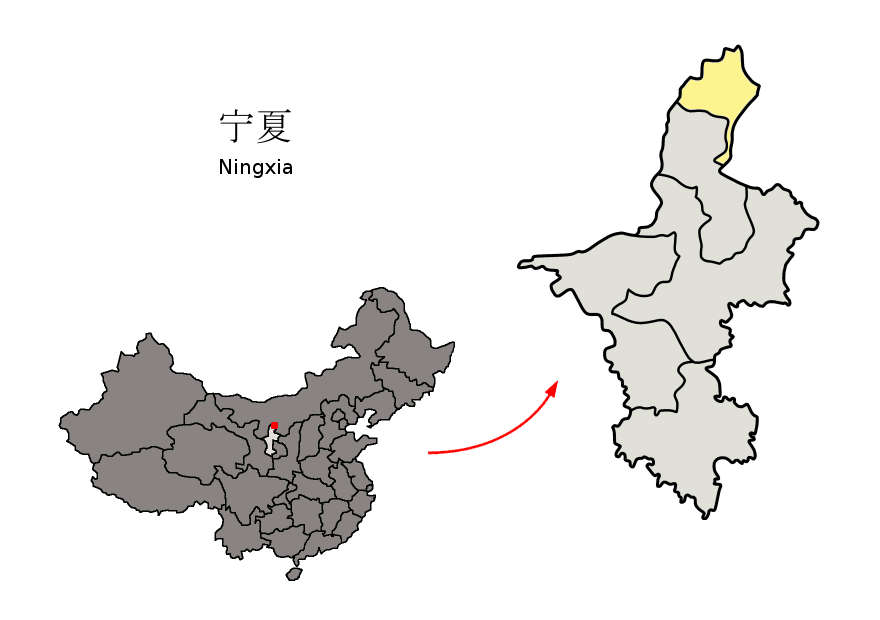
- Shizuishan in Ningxia
- Coordinates: 38°54′49″N 106°31′24″E
- Country: China
- Autonomous region: Ningxia
- Prefecture-level city: Shizuishan
- County seat: Chengguan

Area
  - Total: 2,059.79 km^{2} (795.29 sq mi)

Population
  - Total: 253,010
  - Density: 122.83/km^{2} (318.14/sq mi)
- Time zone: UTC+8 (China Standard)

Pingluo County (simplified Chinese: 平罗县; traditional Chinese: 平羅縣; pinyin: Píngluóxiàn; Wade–Giles: P’ing-luo Hsien, Xiao'erjing: پِئٍ‌لُوَ ثِيًا) is a county under the administration of the prefecture-level city of Shizuishan in the north of the Ningxia Hui Autonomous Region of the People's Republic of China, bordering Inner Mongolia to the northwest and east. It has a total area of 2,608 km^{2} (1,007 sq mi), and a population of approximately 290,000 people.

== Characteristics ==
Situated on the shore of the Yellow River basin, Pingluo County is a well-known agricultural county. Although large and widespread areas of the county consist of low-lying swamps with high salt and alkali content that remain uncultivated, residents still use high-tech methods to undertake agriculture. Today, wheat is the primary crop, because the long sunlight hours in the county are conducive to its cultivation. The county's postal code is 753400.

== Administrative divisions ==
Pingluo County has 7 towns and 6 townships.

7 towns

- Chengguan (城关镇, چٍْ‌قُوًا جٍ)
- Taole (陶乐镇, تَوْلَ جٍ)
- Chonggang (崇岗镇, چْوقَانْ جٍ)
- Yaofu (姚伏镇, يَوْفُ جٍ)
- Touzha (头闸镇, تِوْجَا جٍ)
- Baofeng (宝丰镇, بَوْفٍْ جٍ)
- Huangquqiao (黄渠桥镇, خُوَانْ‌ٿِيُوِٿِيَوْ جٍ)

6 townships

- Tongfu (通伏乡, طْوفُ ثِيَانْ)
- Qukou (渠口乡, ٿِيُوِکِو ثِيَانْ)
- Lingsha (灵沙乡, لِئٍ‌شَا ثِيَانْ)
- Gaoren (高仁乡)
- Gaozhuang (高庄乡)
- Hongyazi (红崖子乡)

== Climate ==
Climate data for Pingluo, elevation 1,099 m (3,606 ft), (1991–2020 normals, extremes 1981–2010)
Month	Jan	Feb	Mar	Apr	May	Jun	Jul	Aug	Sep	Oct	Nov	Dec	Year
Record high °C (°F)	9.8 (49.6)	17.6 (63.7)	27.5 (81.5)	34.6 (94.3)	34.8 (94.6)	37.1 (98.8)	38.9 (102.0)	36.9 (98.4)	35.2 (95.4)	27.4 (81.3)	20.5 (68.9)	15.2 (59.4)	38.9 (102.0)
Mean daily maximum °C (°F)	−0.3 (31.5)	5.0 (41.0)	12.0 (53.6)	19.9 (67.8)	25.1 (77.2)	29.1 (84.4)	30.9 (87.6)	29.0 (84.2)	24.0 (75.2)	17.5 (63.5)	8.2 (46.8)	0.8 (33.4)	16.8 (62.2)
Daily mean °C (°F)	−7.5 (18.5)	−2.9 (26.8)	4.4 (39.9)	12.2 (54.0)	18.1 (64.6)	22.5 (72.5)	24.3 (75.7)	22.4 (72.3)	16.9 (62.4)	9.6 (49.3)	1.8 (35.2)	−5.5 (22.1)	9.7 (49.4)
Mean daily minimum °C (°F)	−13.3 (8.1)	−9.3 (15.3)	−2.2 (28.0)	4.6 (40.3)	10.6 (51.1)	15.4 (59.7)	18.0 (64.4)	16.5 (61.7)	10.8 (51.4)	3.4 (38.1)	−2.9 (26.8)	−10.4 (13.3)	3.4 (38.2)
Record low °C (°F)	−25.0 (−13.0)	−24.0 (−11.2)	−17.3 (0.9)	−8.8 (16.2)	−1.3 (29.7)	4.4 (39.9)	9.0 (48.2)	8.7 (47.7)	−2.0 (28.4)	−9.9 (14.2)	−15.0 (5.0)	−23.0 (−9.4)	−25.0 (−13.0)
Average precipitation mm (inches)	1.2 (0.05)	1.6 (0.06)	3.9 (0.15)	6.7 (0.26)	15.2 (0.60)	30.1 (1.19)	47.9 (1.89)	36.1 (1.42)	28.1 (1.11)	9.5 (0.37)	3.0 (0.12)	0.5 (0.02)	183.8 (7.24)
Average precipitation days (≥ 0.1 mm)	1.4	1.1	1.9	2.6	3.9	5.8	7.6	7.8	6.4	3.5	1.3	0.7	44
Average snowy days	2.6	1.6	1.1	0.4	0	0	0	0	0	0.3	1.1	1.7	8.8
Average relative humidity (%)	54	46	43	37	42	51	60	64	64	57	61	58	53
Mean monthly sunshine hours	209.5	215.0	257.1	273.5	306.1	295.8	286.9	263.9	234.0	241.2	209.6	205.6	2,998.2
Percentage possible sunshine	69	70	69	68	69	67	64	63	64	71	70	70	68
Source: China Meteorological Administration

Climate data for Taole Town, Pingluo County, elevation 1,101 m (3,612 ft), (1991–2020 normals)
Month	Jan	Feb	Mar	Apr	May	Jun	Jul	Aug	Sep	Oct	Nov	Dec	Year
Mean daily maximum °C (°F)	−0.4 (31.3)	4.7 (40.5)	11.9 (53.4)	20.0 (68.0)	25.3 (77.5)	29.3 (84.7)	31.0 (87.8)	29.1 (84.4)	24.1 (75.4)	17.5 (63.5)	8.3 (46.9)	0.9 (33.6)	16.8 (62.3)
Daily mean °C (°F)	−8.3 (17.1)	−3.5 (25.7)	4.0 (39.2)	12.0 (53.6)	18.0 (64.4)	22.5 (72.5)	24.5 (76.1)	22.6 (72.7)	17.0 (62.6)	9.4 (48.9)	0.8 (33.4)	−6.5 (20.3)	9.4 (48.9)
Mean daily minimum °C (°F)	−14.2 (6.4)	−9.8 (14.4)	−2.7 (27.1)	4.3 (39.7)	10.5 (50.9)	15.5 (59.9)	18.3 (64.9)	16.8 (62.2)	11.1 (52.0)	3.3 (37.9)	−4.4 (24.1)	−11.8 (10.8)	3.1 (37.5)
Average precipitation mm (inches)	0.8 (0.03)	1.6 (0.06)	4.5 (0.18)	7.0 (0.28)	18.8 (0.74)	28.4 (1.12)	44.9 (1.77)	33.8 (1.33)	26.1 (1.03)	10.2 (0.40)	3.3 (0.13)	0.5 (0.02)	179.9 (7.09)
Average precipitation days (≥ 0.1 mm)	1.2	0.9	1.9	2.5	4.0	5.9	7.4	6.7	6.6	3.4	1.4	0.6	42.5
Average snowy days	2.4	1.6	1.3	0.4	0	0	0	0	0	0.4	1.1	1.4	8.6
Average relative humidity (%)	52	45	41	36	40	48	57	61	61	55	57	55	51
Mean monthly sunshine hours	207.8	209.8	248.7	266.2	300.9	292.0	288.2	266.8	230.7	246.5	214.0	203.4	2,975
Percentage possible sunshine	68	69	67	67	68	66	64	64	63	72	72	70	68
Source: China Meteorological Administration

Climate data for Shahu, elevation 1,095 m (3,593 ft), (1991–2020 normals)
Month	Jan	Feb	Mar	Apr	May	Jun	Jul	Aug	Sep	Oct	Nov	Dec	Year
Mean daily maximum °C (°F)	0.1 (32.2)	5.0 (41.0)	13.0 (55.4)	20.5 (68.9)	25.2 (77.4)	29.1 (84.4)	31.0 (87.8)	29.2 (84.6)	23.9 (75.0)	17.8 (64.0)	8.7 (47.7)	1.1 (34.0)	17.1 (62.7)
Daily mean °C (°F)	−7.3 (18.9)	−3.2 (26.2)	5.2 (41.4)	13.1 (55.6)	18.5 (65.3)	22.9 (73.2)	24.7 (76.5)	23.0 (73.4)	17.2 (63.0)	10.1 (50.2)	2.1 (35.8)	−5.8 (21.6)	10.0 (50.1)
Mean daily minimum °C (°F)	−12.9 (8.8)	−9.4 (15.1)	−1.3 (29.7)	6.3 (43.3)	11.9 (53.4)	16.9 (62.4)	19.2 (66.6)	17.8 (64.0)	12.1 (53.8)	4.4 (39.9)	−2.6 (27.3)	−10.6 (12.9)	4.3 (39.8)
Average precipitation mm (inches)	0.9 (0.04)	3.2 (0.13)	3.3 (0.13)	9.1 (0.36)	13.1 (0.52)	30.0 (1.18)	49.4 (1.94)	30.8 (1.21)	27.4 (1.08)	11.7 (0.46)	4.1 (0.16)	0.8 (0.03)	183.8 (7.24)
Average precipitation days	1.3	1.3	1.6	3.2	3.5	6.8	8.0	7.1	7.4	3.6	1.5	0.8	46.1
Average snowy days	2.4	1.6	1.3	0.4	0	0	0	0	0	0.4	1.1	1.4	8.6
Average relative humidity (%)	56	48	39	36	40	49	58	61	64	59	61	59	53
Mean monthly sunshine hours	199.2	206.5	257.5	277.3	304.5	289.1	285.4	258.0	224.9	226.3	190.5	196.4	2,915.6
Percentage possible sunshine	65	67	69	69	69	65	64	62	61	66	64	67	66
Source: China Meteorological Administration
