= Qianjiang, Hubei =

Qianjiang 潜江市 Tsienkiang, Ch’ien-chiang
- Sub-prefectural city
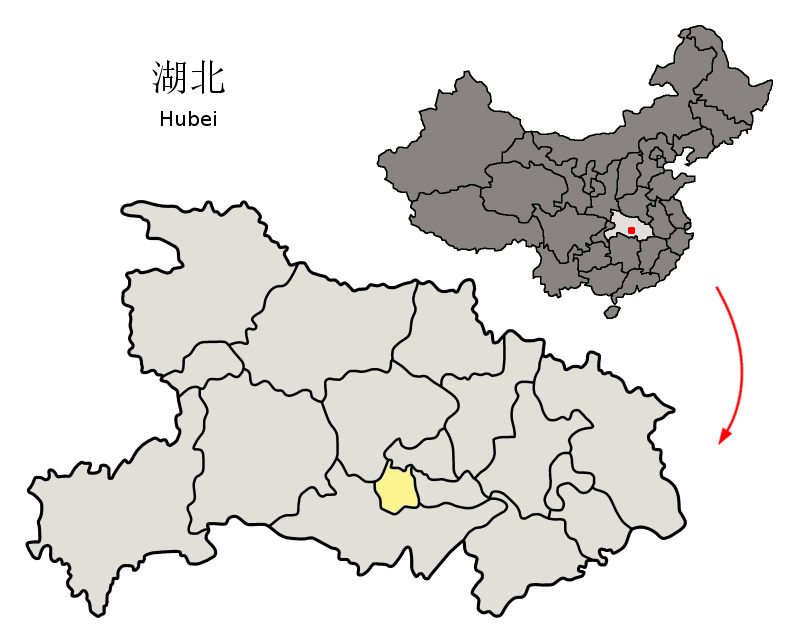
- Location of Qianjiang City jurisdiction in Hubei

- Location of the city centre in Hubei
- Coordinates (Qianjiang government): 30°24′07″N 112°54′01″E
- Country: People's Republic of China
- Province: Hubei

Area
  - Sub-prefectural city: 2,004 km^{2} (774 sq mi)
  - Urban: 311.25 km^{2} (120.17 sq mi)
- Elevation: 32 m (105 ft)

Population (2020)
  - Sub-prefectural city: 886,547
  - Density: 442.4/km^{2} (1,146/sq mi)
  - Urban: 494,334
  - Urban density: 1,588.2/km^{2} (4,113.5/sq mi)

GDP
  - County-level & Sub-prefectural city: CN¥ 55.8 billion US$ 9.0 billion
  - Per capita: CN¥ 58,311; US$ 9,362
- Time zone: UTC+08:00 (China Standard)
- Website: 潜江市人民政府门户网站 (translation: Qianjiang City People's Government Web Portal) (in Simplified Chinese)

Qianjiang (simplified Chinese: 潜江; traditional Chinese: 潛江; pinyin: Qiánjiāng) is a sub-prefectural city of south-central Hubei Province, China. The city spans an area of 2,004 square kilometres (774 sq mi), and has a population of 946,277 as of 2010.

== Toponymy ==
Qianjiang's name means river diving, with the first character referring to qián shuǐ, the Chinese verb for diving, and the second character, jiāng, meaning river.

== History ==
During the Spring and Autumn period and the Warring States period, the area belonged to the independent state of Chu.

In the Three Kingdoms period, the area of present-day Qianjiang was part of the Eastern Wu.

Portions of present-day Qianjiang were ruled by the Sui dynasty as part of Mianyang Commandery.

Part of Qianjiang was incorporated into the Tang dynasty as Jiangling County (simplified Chinese: 江陵县; traditional Chinese: 江陵縣). In 857 CE, the area was placed under the Jiedu Envoy of Jingnan.

During the Five Dynasties and Ten Kingdoms period, the area belonged to the independent kingdom of Jingnan. Qianjiang County (simplified Chinese: 潜江县; traditional Chinese: 潛江縣; pinyin: Qiánjiāng Xiàn) was first organized in 965 CE, during the Song dynasty.

In 1293, during the Yuan dynasty, local flooding prompted officials to move the county center to present-day Yuanlin Subdistrict.

=== Republic of China and World War II ===
In 1913, when the Republic of China introduced circuit system, the area was placed under the jurisdiction of Xiangyang Circuit. In 1925, circuits were abolished, and the area was directly administered by the province.

From the spring of 1930 to the winter of 1932, Qianjiang belonged to the Hunan–Hubei–Jiangxi Soviet.

In 1932, the area was organized by the Republic of China under the new Administrative Inspectorate system, belonging to the province's Seventh Administrative Inspectorate. In 1934, the area was placed under the Sixth Administrative Inspectorate.

Qianjiang was occupied by the Japanese during the Sino-Japanese War from May 1939 to August 1945. The Japanese primarily used prominent local Chinese to run the "puppet" government, notably many members of the Zhang family. From the spring of 1942 to the autumn of 1945, the area hosted a number of regional resistance governments.

=== People's Republic of China ===
The area was captured by the People's Liberation Army in December 1947.

Upon the foundation of the People's Republic of China in 1949, the area was placed under Jingzhou Prefecture.

The communists from 1949 to early 1980s constructed a pharmaceutical plant, a textile factory, a book-printing factory, a large oil-and-gas drilling field, and other industrial installations in the Qianjiang area. As the national economic reform took force beginning in the late 1970s many of these state-run businesses went under.

During the period from 1959 to 1962, the largest "Cadre Camp" in China, or in the world as people at that time liked to call it, was established in Qianjiang. The camp was established due to fears of a potential war between the Soviet Union and China following the Sino-Soviet split. As a result of these fears, the Chinese government dispersed people and resources throughout the country. Many young college graduates were sent to local Cadre Camps to train and entrench. This was the so-called "Priority 1 Order" given by Vice Chairman Lin Biao and planned by Chairman Mao.

The young cadres in Qianjiang worked to improve the agricultural situation, such as draining hundreds of acres of a local lake to be used as farmland. However, this action caused damage to the local ecosystem.

Qianjiang was well known for abundant local produces. Prominent local produces include duck eggs and lily seeds. They were so abundant that the produces were often sold at a nominal price. However, around the year of 1960, Qianjiang didn't escape the fate of most Chinese towns and was swept by an extended famine that was grossly caused by the political destruction of the fundamental aspects of the economy (production, supply-chain, and ownership). Many in Qianjiang were starved to death.

People from Qianjiang and surrounding areas, compared with people from the rest of the Hubei Province, have a reputation for being generous, gentle, and sincere. Prior to the modern days, Qianjiang demonstrated traditional, agriculture-based, Chinese ethos. E.g., if the farmers consider a water buffalo has been hard-working and loyal they would not slaughter it. But rather they would wait until it ages and dies. Then they would bury it and then build it a tomb.

There was a labor camp during the communist era in the Qianjiang area. The conditions at the camp were harsh. People would often sneak out to seek additional food. However, they never attempted to escape because it was impossible to hide in any place during those decades. Every town was tightly controlled and monitored by the government. No one would provide a stranger shelter and would only report him immediately to the local government.

In 1970, the area was reorganized as Jingzhou Area.

On May 25, 1988, Qianjiang County was abolished, and was replaced with a county-level city.

In October 1994, Qianjiang was re-organized as a sub-prefectural city.

== Geography ==
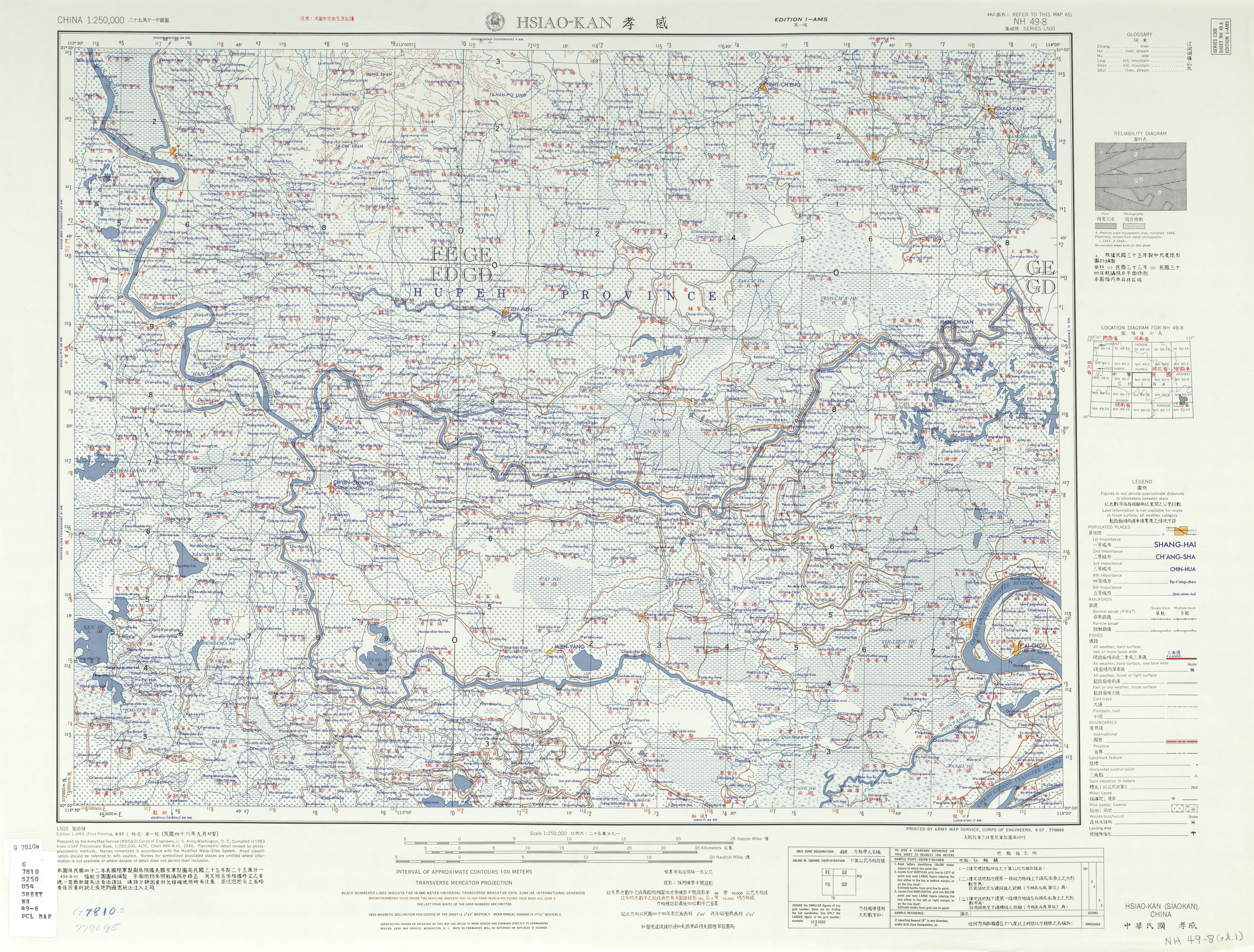
Map including Qianjiang (labeled as CH'IEN-CHIANG (TSIENKIANG) 潛江) (1953)

Qianjiang is located in south-central Hubei province in the Jianghan Plain, spanning an area of 2,004 square kilometres (774 sq mi). Qianjiang is bordered by Tianmen to the north, Xiantao to the east, Jianli to the southeast, Jiangling County to the southwest, Jingzhou District to the west, and Shayang County to the northwest.

The city's topography is largely flat, with an average elevation of 38 metres (125 ft), a high point of 39.78 metres (130.5 ft), and a low point of 25.78 metres (84.6 ft).

Qianjiang is home to many rivers and lakes. Major rivers in the city include the Han River and the Dongjing River. Major lakes in the city include the Fanwan Lake, Bailu Lake, Jieliang Lake, and Fengjia Lake (Chinese: 冯家湖). However, starting in the early 80's most of them disappeared due to urbanization and industrialization.

=== Climate ===
Qianjiang's climate is temperate, with an average annual temperature of 16 °C (61 °F), and an average annual precipitation of around 1,110 millimetres (44 in).

Climate data for Qianjiang, elevation 31 m (102 ft), (1991–2020 normals, extremes 1981–present)
| Month | Jan | Feb | Mar | Apr | May | Jun | Jul | Aug | Sep | Oct | Nov | Dec | Year |
|---|---|---|---|---|---|---|---|---|---|---|---|---|---|
| Record high °C (°F) | 20.5 (68.9) | 26.5 (79.7) | 32.0 (89.6) | 33.8 (92.8) | 35.6 (96.1) | 37.2 (99.0) | 37.8 (100.0) | 39.2 (102.6) | 36.6 (97.9) | 32.8 (91.0) | 29.3 (84.7) | 22.0 (71.6) | 39.2 (102.6) |
| Mean daily maximum °C (°F) | 8.3 (46.9) | 11.3 (52.3) | 16.0 (60.8) | 22.3 (72.1) | 27.2 (81.0) | 30.1 (86.2) | 32.3 (90.1) | 32.3 (90.1) | 28.6 (83.5) | 23.2 (73.8) | 16.9 (62.4) | 10.8 (51.4) | 21.6 (70.9) |
| Daily mean °C (°F) | 4.2 (39.6) | 6.9 (44.4) | 11.4 (52.5) | 17.3 (63.1) | 22.3 (72.1) | 25.9 (78.6) | 28.4 (83.1) | 28.0 (82.4) | 23.7 (74.7) | 18.1 (64.6) | 12.0 (53.6) | 6.4 (43.5) | 17.1 (62.7) |
| Mean daily minimum °C (°F) | 1.3 (34.3) | 3.6 (38.5) | 7.8 (46.0) | 13.3 (55.9) | 18.4 (65.1) | 22.6 (72.7) | 25.3 (77.5) | 24.7 (76.5) | 20.3 (68.5) | 14.5 (58.1) | 8.4 (47.1) | 3.1 (37.6) | 13.6 (56.5) |
| Record low °C (°F) | −9.8 (14.4) | −5.0 (23.0) | −1.5 (29.3) | 1.3 (34.3) | 8.8 (47.8) | 12.1 (53.8) | 19.2 (66.6) | 16.8 (62.2) | 10.6 (51.1) | 1.6 (34.9) | −2.4 (27.7) | −9.5 (14.9) | −9.8 (14.4) |
| Average precipitation mm (inches) | 40.6 (1.60) | 53.8 (2.12) | 79.1 (3.11) | 131.3 (5.17) | 159.7 (6.29) | 192.4 (7.57) | 208.7 (8.22) | 111.3 (4.38) | 75.4 (2.97) | 71.1 (2.80) | 56.7 (2.23) | 25.6 (1.01) | 1,205.7 (47.47) |
| Average precipitation days (≥ 0.1 mm) | 9.0 | 10.4 | 12.5 | 12.0 | 12.8 | 11.7 | 10.5 | 9.1 | 8.0 | 9.9 | 9.7 | 7.9 | 123.5 |
| Average snowy days | 4.3 | 2.8 | 1.0 | 0 | 0 | 0 | 0 | 0 | 0 | 0 | 0.4 | 1.4 | 9.9 |
| Average relative humidity (%) | 75 | 75 | 76 | 77 | 76 | 80 | 81 | 80 | 77 | 76 | 77 | 73 | 77 |
| Mean monthly sunshine hours | 89.5 | 89.6 | 118.8 | 144.5 | 160.2 | 155.5 | 207.2 | 203.2 | 152.3 | 134.7 | 121.0 | 107.2 | 1,683.7 |
| Percentage possible sunshine | 28 | 28 | 32 | 37 | 38 | 37 | 49 | 50 | 42 | 39 | 38 | 34 | 38 |
Source: China Meteorological Administration

== Administrative divisions ==
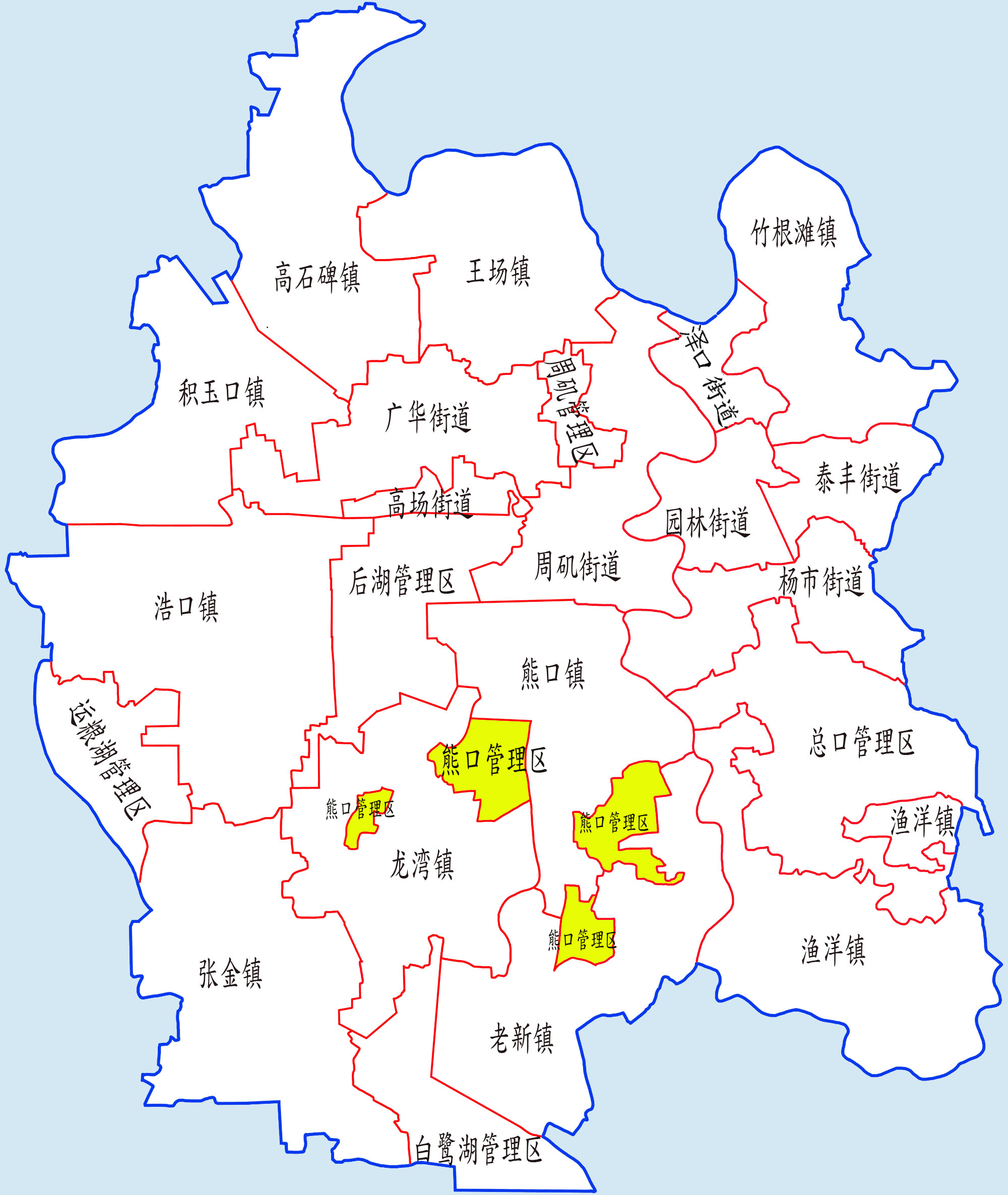
Administrative divisions of Qianjiang

As of 2020, Qianjiang administers 6 subdistricts, 10 towns, and 8 other township-level divisions.

=== Subdistricts ===
Qianjiang administers the following 6 subdistricts:

| Official name | Hanzi | Toponymy |
|---|---|---|
| Yuanlin Subdistrict | 园林街道 | Chinese garden |
| Yangshi Subdistrict | 杨市街道 | Willow city |
| Zhouji Subdistrict | 周矶街道 | Zhou rock |
| Guanghua Subdistrict | 广华街道 | Broad flowers |
| Taifeng Subdistrict | 泰丰街道 | Large and abundant |
| Gaoyang Subdistrict | 高场街道 | High field |

=== Towns ===
Qianjiang administers the following 10 towns:

| Official name | Hanzi | Toponymy |
|---|---|---|
| Zhugentan | 竹根滩镇 | |
| Yuyang | 渔洋镇 | |
| Wangyang | 王场镇 | |
| Gaoshibei | 高石碑镇 | |
| Xiongkou | 熊口镇 | Bear mouth |
| Laoxin | 老新镇 | Old new |
| Haokou | 浩口镇 | |
| Jiyukou | 积玉口镇 | |
| Zhangjin | 张金镇 | |
| Longwan | 龙湾镇 | |

=== Other township-level divisions ===
Qianjiang administers the following 8 other township-level divisions:

| Official name | Hanzi | Toponymy |
|---|---|---|
| Qianjiang Development Zone | 潜江经济开发区 | |
| Zhouji Administrative Area | 周矶管理区 | Zhou rock |
| Houhu Administrative Area | 后湖管理区 | |
| Xiongkou Administrative Area | 熊口管理区 | Bear mouth |
| Zongkou Administrative Area | 总口管理区 | |
| Bailuhu Administrative Area | 白鹭湖管理区 | Bailu Lake |
| Yunlianghu Administrative Area | 运粮湖管理区 | Yunliang lake |
| Haokou Seed Stock Farm | 浩口原种场 | |

== Transport ==
National Highway 318 and the Yihuang Expressway (Chinese: 宜黄高速公路) from Yichang to Huangshi both pass through Qianjiang from east to west. The Xiangyue Highway (Chinese: 襄岳公路) from Xiangyang to Yueyang passes through Qianjing from south to north.

The Shanghai–Wuhan–Chengdu high-speed railway passes through Qianjiang from east to west.

The city has two deep-water ports: Zekou (Chinese: 泽口) and Hongmiao (Chinese: 红庙).

== Demographics ==
According to the 2010 Chinese Census, Qianjiang has a total population of 946,277, down from the 992,438 reported in the 2000 Chinese Census. In 1996, the city's population was estimated to be 933,000.

== Economy ==
Qianjiang is a major producer of grain, cotton, petroleum, natural gas, and salt.

Qianjiang has an important oil field, Jianghan Oil Field. It's part of the Sinopec Corporation. Qianjiang has the potential of producing 200 million tons of oil, more than 9000 m^{3} of natural gas, and 800 billion tons of rock salt. In 2001 Qiangjiang started producing crayfish and now producers over 70,000 tonnes a year and accounting for over 60% of China's export of crayfish. The region is also home to the world's largest crustacean sculpture.

Major companies with operations in the city include Yangtze Optical Fiber and Cable, Jinrui (Chinese: 晶瑞), Dinglong (Chinese: 鼎龙), and Zall Development.

== Culture ==
The city has a unique theatre culture, with Qianjiang Flower Drum Opera (Chinese: 潜江花鼓戏), Qianjiang Shadow Play (Chinese: 潜江皮影戏), and Qianjiang Folk Song (Chinese: 潜江民歌) all being included in China's National Intangible Cultural Heritage Protection List.

== Notable sites ==
- Ruins of Zhanghua Palace (simplified Chinese: 章华宫; traditional Chinese: 章華宮), built by King Ling of Chu
- Ruins of Huarong Road

== Notable people ==
- Li Hanjun
- Li Shucheng
- Lü Xiaojun
- Qian Ying
- Yao Lifa
