= Baima Township, Hebei =

Baima Township 白马乡
- Township
- Location in Hebei
- Coordinates: 39°23′42″N 115°30′58″E
- Country: People's Republic of China
- Province: Hebei
- Prefecture-level city: Baoding
- County: Yi
- Village-level divisions: 18 villages
- Elevation: 84 m (276 ft)
- Time zone: UTC+8 (China Standard)
- Area code: 0312

Baima Township (simplified Chinese: 白马乡; traditional Chinese: 白馬鄉; pinyin: Báimǎ Xiāng; lit. 'white horse') is a township of northeastern Yi County in the eastern foothills of the Taihang Mountains in west-central Hebei province, China, located adjacent to and northeast of the county seat as the crow flies. As of 2020, it has 18 villages under its administration:

- Zhongbaima Village (中白马村)
- Dongbaima Village (东白马村)
- Xibaima Village (西白马村)
- Nanbaima Village (南白马村)
- Beibaima Village (北白马村)
- Qilizhuang Village (七里庄村)
- Weijiafen Village (魏家坟村)
- Ruixiaqiao Village (瑞霞桥村)
- Xizhangjiazhuang Village (西张家庄村)
- Panshenmiao Village (盘神庙村)
- Zhenwumiao Village (真武庙村)
- Shangbaiyang Village (上白羊村)
- Shanghuanghao Village (上黄蒿村)
- Xibaiyang Village (西白羊村)
- Nanbaiyang Village (南白羊村)
- Dongbaiyang Village (东白羊村)
- Majiazhuang Village (马家庄村)
- Yuanquan Village (源泉村)

== See also ==
- List of township-level divisions of Hebei
