= Baima, Beiliu =

Baima 白马镇
- Town
- Location in Guangxi
- Coordinates: 22°20′11″N 110°40′35″E
- Country: People's Republic of China
- Autonomous Region: Guangxi
- Prefecture-level city: Yulin
- County-level city: Beiliu
- Time zone: UTC+8 (China Standard)

Baima (simplified Chinese: 白马; traditional Chinese: 白馬; pinyin: báimǎ) is a town of Beiliu, Guangxi, China. As of 2020, it administers Baimaxu Residential Community (白马圩社区) and the following nine villages:

- Baima Village
- Huangjin Village (黄金村)
- Muyong Village (睦雍村)
- Dongtang Village (东塘村)
- Dongwei Village (垌尾村)
- Chaxin Village (茶新村)
- Huanglong Village (黄龙村)
- Jintou Village (金头村)
- Gendong Village (根垌村)
