= Yao Lifa =

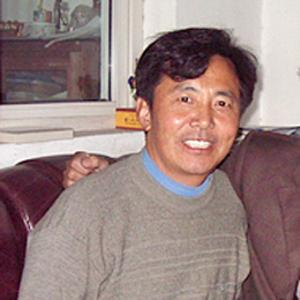
Yao Lifa

Yao Lifa (Chinese: 姚立法; pinyin: Yáo Lìfǎ; born 1958 in Qianjiang, Hubei) is apparently the first person in China elected through self-nomination to a municipal-level people's congress.

Yao, who has a vocational school education and works at an elementary school, began competing for a seat in the local people's congress in 1987, when the election law was first promulgated. The law allows for self-nominated candidates, and Yao used this provision to run for office.

Twelve years later, in 1998, he was finally successful. Over the course of the next five years, Yao was a busy and controversial figure—he raised 187 of the 459 suggestions, opinions, and criticisms presented to the local people's congress. Yao also undertook a survey of the 329 villages under Qianjiang City and found that 187 village chairmen and 432 vice chairmen and village committee members in 269 villages who had been elected in 1999—some 57 percent of the total—had been dismissed over the course of the following three years. Sensing a mandate, he railed against the detention of peasants who refused to pay illegal fees, collected more than 10,000 signatures criticizing a Party official, denounced the wasting of public money on marble tiled street curbs, and made multiple suggested revisions to the Rules of the Road in China.

In 2003, 40 other people—including teachers, village heads, lawyers, workers, and peasants joined Yao put themselves forward as candidates for the Qianjiang Municipal People's Congress, and 32 of them continued the full campaign. In an election fraught with controversy, the whole group of self-nominated candidates lost the election, though Yao at least vowed to run again in the next election. Because Yao and the others were not backed by local authorities, their only chance of being elected was to wage a write-in campaign. Yao had succeeded in doing so in 1998, but had "no chance" of doing so again in 2003. A few independent candidates were elected that year, but failed to do so in succeeding elections from 2006 onwards.

In 2006, a former China Central Television (CCTV) legal affairs correspondent Zhu Ling, wrote a biography of Yao Lifa named I object—the Road to Politics by a People's Congress Deputy. Based on three years of research, the book chronicles Yao Lifa's 12-year struggle to run for a seat on a county legislature in Hubei province. This book was banned in 2007.

Under his help, there are more and more independent candidates coming out. After meeting Yao Lifa in 2003, Lu Banglie began to turn to grassroots democracy and won the seat in congress at the end of 2003 with Yao's help.

Following his term, Yao has been regularly held in custody by security forces, having stated that he was detained five times in 2009 during "politically sensitive" events. In 2011, Yao was placed under surveillance; at one point he jumped off a building to escape from the authorities and was considered missing for several months until it was revealed that he was imprisoned in Beijing. Voice of America interviewed him in 2021; according to him, he was still under covert surveillance.
