= Baima, Neijiang =

Baima 白马镇
- Town
- Location in Sichuan
- Coordinates: 29°31′54″N 104°59′15″E
- Country: People's Republic of China
- Province: Sichuan
- Prefecture-level city: Neijiang
- District: Shizhong
- Village-level divisions: 4 residential communities 13 villages
- Elevation: 300 m (980 ft)
- Time zone: UTC+8 (China Standard)
- Area code: 0832

Baima (simplified Chinese: 白马; traditional Chinese: 白馬; pinyin: Báimǎ; lit. 'white horse') is a town of Shizhong District, in the southwestern suburbs of Neijiang, Sichuan, People's Republic of China, situated on the northwestern (right) bank of the Tuo River about 8.1 kilometres (5.0 mi) from downtown.

As of 2020, it has four residential neighborhoods and 13 villages under its administration:

Neighborhoods

- Baima Street Community (白马街社区)
- Simaqiao Community (司马桥社区)
- Huangshi Community (黄石社区)
- Chaotianmen Community (朝天门社区)

Villages

- Dongjia Village (董家村)
- Qianzi Village (千子村)
- Lianhe Village (联合村)
- Shuanghe Village (双河村)
- Shipan Village (石盘村)
- Shimiao Village (石庙村)
- Baita Village (白塔村)
- Jiupan Village (九盘村)
- Haitang Village (海棠村)
- Longdong Village (龙洞村)
- Bailayuan Village (白蜡园村)
- Sanbianchong Village (三边冲村)
- Baxian Village (坝贤村)

== See also ==
- List of township-level divisions of Sichuan
