= Baima Subdistrict =

Baima Subdistrict 白马街道
- Subdistrict
- Location in China
- Coordinates: 31.2057°N 118.3803°E
- Country: People's Republic of China
- Province: Anhui
- Prefecture-level city: Wuhu
- District: Yijiang District
- Time zone: UTC+8 (China Standard)

Baima Subdistrict (simplified Chinese: 白马街道; traditional Chinese: 白馬街道; pinyin: Báimǎ Jiēdào) is a subdistrict in Yijiang District, Wuhu, Anhui, China. As of 2020, it administers Shiwei Residential Community (石硊社区) and the following eight villages:

- Baima Village
- Taying Village (塔影村)
- Yixing Village (义兴村)
- Xinyi Village (新义村)
- Xindahan Village (新大垾村)
- Paifang Village (牌坊村)
- Qingzhu Village (清竹村)
- Xinshan Village (新山村)

== See also ==
- List of township-level divisions of Anhui
