= Hongyazi, Liaoning =

Hongyazi 红崖子镇
- Town
- Location in Liaoning
- Coordinates: 40°37′10″N 120°30′31″E
- Country: People's Republic of China
- Province: Liaoning
- Prefecture-level city: Huludao
- County-level city: Xingcheng
- Time zone: UTC+8 (China Standard)

Hongyazi (simplified Chinese: 红崖子; traditional Chinese: 紅崖子; pinyin: Hóngyázǐ) is a town in Xingcheng, Liaoning, China. As of 2020, it administers the following 19 villages:

- Hongyazi Village
- Tangtun Village (汤屯村)
- Liangjiatun Village (梁家屯村)
- Erdaobian Village (二道边村)
- Sandaobian Village (三道边村)
- Guchengzi Village (古城子村)
- Zhoutun Village (周屯村)
- Laofuma Village (老付马村)
- Xi'ertaizi Village (西二台子村)
- Jianjin Village (拣金村)
- Bianhaozi Village (边壕子村)
- Tuanshanzi Village (团山子村)
- Dadonggou Village (大东沟村)
- Laoshaoguo Village (老烧锅村)
- Xinqi Village (新齐村)
- Wujiatun Village (吴家屯村)
- Dashantai Village (大山台村)
- Xiaoshantai Village (小山台村)
- Yingshu Village (英树村)
