= Baima, Xuanhan County =

Baima 白马镇
- Town
- Location in Sichuan
- Coordinates: 31°37′27″N 108°05′46″E
- Country: People's Republic of China
- Province: Sichuan
- Prefecture-level city: Dazhou
- County: Xuanhan
- Village-level divisions: 1 residential community 5 villages
- Elevation: 500 m (1,600 ft)
- Highest elevation: 1,605 m (5,266 ft)
- Lowest elevation: 420 m (1,380 ft)

Population
  - Total: 18,500
- Time zone: UTC+8 (China Standard)
- Area code: 0818

Baima (simplified Chinese: 白马; traditional Chinese: 白馬; pinyin: Báimǎ; lit. 'white horse') is a town of 18,500 people in northeastern Xuanhan County, in northeastern Sichuan province, China, located 46 kilometres (29 mi) northeast of the county seat as the crow flies. As of 2020, it administers Shuanglong Residential Community (双龙社区) and the following five villages

- Shaping Village (沙坪村)
- Guanyan Village (观岩村)
- Baizhen Village (白镇村)
- Bicheng Village (毕城村)
- Ma'an Village (马鞍村)
