= Baima, Leshan =

Baima 白马镇
- Town
- Location in Sichuan
- Coordinates: 29°40′39″N 103°57′22″E
- Country: People's Republic of China
- Province: Sichuan
- Prefecture-level city: Leshan
- District: Shizhong
- Village-level divisions: 2 residential communities 15 villages
- Elevation: 440 m (1,440 ft)
- Time zone: UTC+8 (China Standard)
- Area code: 0833

Baima (simplified Chinese: 白马; traditional Chinese: 白馬; pinyin: Báimǎ; lit. 'white horse') is a town of Shizhong District, Leshan, Sichuan, People's Republic of China, situated about 22 kilometres (14 mi) to the northeast of downtown Leshan. As of 2020, it has two residential communities and 15 villages under its administration:

- Baimachang Community (白马场社区)
- Tongjiachang Community (童家场社区)
- Wanjing Village (万井村)
- Chejiashan Village (车架山村)
- Jinghua Village (精华村)
- Baihe Village (白鹤村)
- Mochihe Village (磨池河村)
- Hongguang Village (红光村)
- Guangming Village (光明村)
- Kaihua Village (开化村)
- Shengxi Village (胜西村)
- Hongqi Village (红旗村)
- Fenghuang Village (凤凰村)
- Chaoyang Village (朝阳村)
- Lejia Village (乐加村)
- Songbai Village (松柏村)
- Liu Village (流村)

== See also ==
- List of township-level divisions of Sichuan
