= Baima Township, Gansu =

Baima Township 白马乡
- Township
- Location in Gansu
- Coordinates: 36°35′34″N 107°43′35″E
- Country: People's Republic of China
- Province: Gansu
- Prefecture-level city: Qingyang
- County: Huachi
- Village-level divisions: 6 villages, 1 forest area
- Elevation: 1,306 m (4,285 ft)
- Time zone: UTC+8 (China Standard)
- Area code: 0934

Baima Township (simplified Chinese: 白马乡; traditional Chinese: 白馬鄉; pinyin: Báimǎ Xiāng; lit. 'white horse') is a township of Huachi County in eastern Gansu province, China, located about 28 kilometres (17 mi) northwest of the county seat as the crow flies. As of 2020, it administers Baima Forestry Residential Neighborhood and the following six villages:

- Baima Village
- Lianji Village (连集村)
- Wanggoumen Village (王沟门村)
- Magaozhuang Village (马高庄村)
- Dongzhang Village (东掌村)
- Duzhaizi Village (杜寨子村)

== See also ==
- List of township-level divisions of Gansu
