= Baima, Taizhou, Jiangsu =

Baima 白马镇
- Town
- Location in Jiangsu
- Coordinates: 32°25′18″N 119°58′17″E
- Country: People's Republic of China
- Province: Jiangsu
- Prefecture-level city: Taizhou
- District: Gaogang District
- Time zone: UTC+8 (China Standard)

Baima (Chinese: 白马; Chinese: 白馬; pinyin: báimǎ) is a town under the administration of Gaogang District, Taizhou, Jiangsu, China. As of 2020, it has two residential neighborhoods and five villages under its administration: It was also the founding place of the People's Liberation Army Navy.

Neighborhoods

- Baima Community
- Jinma Community (金马社区)

Villages

- Chenjia Village (陈家村)
- Lujia Village (陆家村)
- Daibai Village (岱白村)
- Huanghe Village (黄河村)
- Qianjin Village (前进村)
