= List of township-level divisions of Ningxia =

This is a list of township-level divisions of the province of Ningxia, People's Republic of China (PRC). There are 232 townships.

== Yinchuan ==
=== Jinfeng District ===
5 subdistricts

- Changchengzhonglu (长城中路街道), Shanghaixilu (上海西路街道), Beijingzhonglu (北京中路街道), Huanghe Donglu (黄河东路街道) and Mancheng Beijie (满城北街街道)

2 towns

- Fengdeng (丰登镇) and Liangtian (良田镇)

=== Xingqing District ===
10 subdistricts

- Jiefangxijie (解放西街街道), Wenhuajie (文化街街道), Funingjie (富宁街街道), Xinhuajie (新华街街道),

Yuhuanggebei (玉皇阁北街街道), Qianjinjie (前进街街道), Zhongshannanjie (中山南街街道), Yingulu (银古路街道), Shenglijie (胜利街街道), Lijingjie (丽景街街道), and Fenghuangbeijie (凤凰北街街道): was merged to other.

2 towns:

- Zhangzheng (掌政镇): was merged to other. and Daxin (大新镇): was merged to other.

2 townships:

- Tonggui (通贵乡): was merged to other. and Yueya (月牙湖乡): was merged to other.

=== Xixia District ===
5 subdistricts

- Helanshanxilu (贺兰山西路街道), Ninghualu (宁华路街道), Shuofanglu (朔方路街道), Wenchanglu (文昌路街道), and Beijingxilu (北京西路街道)

2 towns

- Zhenbeibu (镇北堡镇), and Xingjing (兴泾镇)

=== Lingwu City ===
1 subdistrict

- Chengqu (城区街道)

6 towns

- Dongta (东塔镇), Linhe (临河镇), Majiatan (马家滩镇), Ningdong (宁东镇), Chongxing (崇兴镇), and Haojiaqiao (郝家桥镇)

1 township

- Baitugang (白土岗乡)

2 other

- Raw Wolf Skin Ziliang Administration Committee (狼皮子梁管委会), and Lingwu Farm (灵武农场)

=== Helan County ===
4 towns

- Xigang (习岗镇), Hongguang (洪广镇), Ligang (立岗镇), and Jingui (金贵镇)

1 township

- Changxin (常信乡)

2 other

- Nuanquan Farm (暖泉农场), and Nanliang Taizi Administration Committee (南梁台子管委会)

=== Yongning County ===
5 towns

- Yanghe (杨和镇), Minning (闽宁镇), Wanghong (望洪镇), Wangyuan (望远镇), and Lijun (李俊镇)

1 township

- Shengli (胜利乡)

2 other

- Yuquanying Farm (玉泉营农场), and Huangyangtan Farm (黄羊滩农场)

== Guyuan ==
=== Yuanzhou District ===
Yuanzhou County administers 1 subdistrict 5 towns and 4 townships.

1 subdistrict

- Jiqiang (南关街道)

5 Towns

- Sanying (三营镇), Touying (头营镇), Pengbu (彭堡镇), Zhangyi (张易镇), and Kaicheng (开城镇)

4 Townships

- Zhaike (寨科乡), Tanshan (炭山乡), Hechuan (河川乡), and Zhonghe (中河乡)

=== Jingyuan County ===
Jingyuan County administers 3 towns and 4 townships.

3 Towns

- Xiangshui (香水镇), Liupanshan (六盘山镇), and Jingheyuan (泾河源镇)

4 Townships

- Dawan (大湾乡), Huanghua (黄花乡), Xingsheng (兴盛乡), and Xinmin (新民乡)

=== Longde County ===
Longde County administers 3 towns and 7 townships.

3 Towns

- Chengguan (城关镇), Liancai (联财镇), and Shatang (沙塘镇)

7 Townships

- Shanhe (山河乡), Fengling (凤岭乡), Zhangcheng (张程乡), Shenlin (神林乡), Yanghe (杨河乡), Guanzhuang (观庄乡), Haoshui (好水乡), Chenjin (陈靳乡): was merged, Dian'an (奠安乡): was merged, and Wenbu (温堡乡): was merged

=== Pengyang County ===
Pengyang County administers 3 towns and 7 townships.

3 Towns

- Baiyang (白阳镇), Gucheng (古城镇), and Wangwa (王洼镇)

7 Townships

- Jiaocha (交岔乡), Luowa (罗洼乡), Mengyuan (孟塬乡), Xiaocha (小岔乡), Fengzhuang (冯庄乡), Chengyang (城阳乡), and Xinji (新集乡)

=== Xiji County ===
Xiji County administers 3 towns and 7 townships.

3 Towns

- Jiqiang (吉强镇), Pingfeng (平峰镇), and Xinglong (兴隆镇)

7 Townships

- Wangmin (王民乡), Xitan (西滩乡), Xingping (兴平乡), Zhenhu (震湖乡), Majian (马建乡), Tianping (田坪乡), and Hongyao (红耀乡)

== Shizuishan City ==
=== Dawukou District ===
10 subdistricts

- Renminlu (人民路街道), Chaoyang (朝阳街道), Changsheng (长胜街道), Jinlin (锦林街道), Changxing (长兴街道), Goukou (沟口街道), Baijigou (白芨沟街道), Shitanjing (石炭井街道), Qingshan (青山街道), and Changcheng (长城街道)

=== Huinong District ===
6 subdistricts

- Beijie (北街街道), Zhongjie (中街街道), Nanjie (南街街道), Yucailu (育才路街道), Huochezhan (火车站街道), and Hebin (河滨街道)

3 towns

- Yuanyi (园艺镇), Weizha (尾闸镇), and Hongguozi (红果子镇)

1 township

- Lihe (礼和乡)

=== Pingluo County ===
7 towns

- Chengguan (城关镇), Taole (陶乐镇), Chonggang (崇岗镇), Yaofu (姚伏镇), Touzha (头闸镇), Baofeng (宝丰镇), and Huangquqiao (黄渠桥镇)

3 townships

- Tongfu (通伏乡), Qukou (渠口乡), and Lingsha (灵沙乡)

== Wuzhong City ==
=== Hongsibu District ===
2 towns

- Hongsibu (红寺堡镇)Taiyangshan (太阳山镇)

1 township

- Dahe (大河乡)

=== Litong District ===
Litong City administers 8 towns and 2 townships.

8 towns

- Gucheng (古城镇), Shangqiao (上桥镇), Shengli (胜利镇), Jinxing (金星镇), Jinji (金积镇), Jinyintan (金银滩镇), Gaozha (高闸镇), and Biandangou (扁担沟镇)

2 townships

- Banqiao (板桥乡), Malianqu (马莲渠乡),

Dongtasi (东塔寺乡): was merged to other, and Guojiaqiao (郭家桥乡): was merged to other.

=== Qingtongxia City ===
Qingtongxia City administers 1 subdistrict 7 towns and 2 others : farms.

1 subdistrict

- Yumin (裕民街道)

7 towns

- Xiaoba (小坝镇), Chenyuantan (陈袁滩镇), Xiakou (峡口镇),

Qujing (瞿靖镇), Yesheng (叶盛镇), Qingtongxia (青铜峡镇), and Daba (大坝镇)

2 others : farms

- Shuxin Forestry Farm (树新林场), and Lianhu Farm (连湖农场)

=== Tongxin County ===
Tongxin County administers 6 towns and 3 townships.

6 towns

- Yuhai (豫海镇), Dingtang (丁塘镇), Wangtuan (王团镇),

Xiamaguan (下马关镇), Weizhou (韦州镇), and Hexi (河西镇)

3 townships

- Xinglong (兴隆乡), Magaozhuang (马高庄乡), and Tianlaozhuang (田老庄乡)

=== Yanchi County ===
Yanchi County administers 4 towns and 4 townships.

4 towns

- Huamachi (花马池镇), Gaoshawo (高沙窝镇), Hui′anbu (惠安堡镇), and Dashuikeng (大水坑镇)

4 townships

- Mahuangshan (麻黄山乡), Qingshan (青山乡), Fengjigou (冯记沟乡), and Wanglejing (王乐井乡)

== Zhongwei City ==
=== Haiyuan County ===
Haiyuan County administers 5 towns and 5 townships.

5 Towns

- Sanhe (三河镇), Qiying (七营镇), Xi′an (西安镇), Liwang (李旺镇), and Haicheng (海城镇)

5 Townships

- Jiatang (贾塘乡), Zhengqi (郑旗乡), Gaoya (高崖乡), Guanqiao (关桥乡), and Shutai (树台乡)

=== Zhongning County ===
Zhongning County has 5 towns and 5 townships.

5 towns

- Ning′an (宁安镇), Enhe (恩和镇), Xinbu (新堡镇), Shikong (石空镇), and Mingsha(鸣沙镇)

5 townships

- Xutao (徐套乡), Hanjiaoshui (喊叫水乡), Yuding (余丁乡),

Baima (白马乡), and Zhouta (舟塔乡)
