= Baima Township, Guangxi =

Baima Township 百马乡
- Township
- Location in Guangxi
- Coordinates: 23°52′54″N 107°44′38″E
- Country: People's Republic of China
- Autonomous region: Guangxi
- Prefecture-level city: Hechi
- Autonomous county: Dahua Yao Autonomous County
- Time zone: UTC+8 (China Standard)

Baima Township (simplified Chinese: 百马乡; traditional Chinese: 百馬鄉; pinyin: Bǎimǎ Xiāng) is a township under the administration of Dahua Yao Autonomous County, Guangxi, China. As of 2020, it has ten villages under its administration:

- Baima Village
- Polou Village (坡楼村)
- Yongjing Village (永靖村)
- Zhonghe Village (中和村)
- Xiahe Village (下和村)
- Liuren Village (六任村)
- Dengpai Village (登排村)
- Keyou Village (科优村)
- Mengdou Village (孟豆村)
- Tongshe Village (同社村)
