= Baima Township, Guang'an =

Baima Township 白马乡
- Township
- Location in Sichuan
- Coordinates: 30°36′09″N 106°49′13″E
- Country: People's Republic of China
- Province: Sichuan
- Prefecture-level city: Guang'an
- District: Guang'an
- Village-level divisions: 6 villages, 1 residential community
- Elevation: 297 m (974 ft)
- Time zone: UTC+8 (China Standard)
- Area code: 0826

Baima Township (simplified Chinese: 白马乡; traditional Chinese: 白馬鄉; pinyin: Báimǎ Xiāng; lit. 'white horse') is a township of Guang'an District, Guang'an, Sichuan, People's Republic of China, located 24 kilometres (15 mi) northeast of downtown as the crow flies.

As of 2020, it administers Minxin Residential Community (民兴社区) and the following six villages:

- Baima Village
- Shihe Village (石河村)
- Guoguang Village (国光村)
- Hongxing Village (红星村)
- Shiti Village (石梯村)
- Tongxin Village (同心村)

== See also ==
- List of township-level divisions of Sichuan
