= West China City Daily =

Simplified Chinese newspaper

- Native name: 华西都市报
- Type: Daily newspaper
- Format: Broadsheet
- Owner: Sichuan Daily Newspaper Industry Group
- Publisher: West China City Daily Agency
- Founded: 1 January 1995; 31 years ago
- Language: Simplified Chinese
- Headquarters: Chengdu
- OCLC number: 144519329
- Website: wccdaily.com.cn

West China City Daily (WCCD; Chinese: 华西都市报), also translated as West China Metropolis Daily, is a daily newspaper based in Chengdu, owned by the Sichuan Daily Newspaper Group (四川日报报业集团). WCCD was launched on 1 January 1995 as China's first “city newspaper,” pioneering a market-oriented model that combined news reporting with community services in response to the rise of China's urban middle class and consumer society.

Preparations for the newspaper began in early 1994, and the inaugural issue was published on New Year's Day 1995. It reached its peak circulation during the 2000s, becoming the largest newspaper in western China.

In 2014, the newspaper established Cover Media (封面传媒). On 4 May 2015, it launched the Cover News mobile news platform (封面新闻), after which it shifted its focus toward new media and integrated media operations.
