= Baima, Suining =

Baima 白马镇
- Town
- Location in Sichuan
- Coordinates: 30°26′00″N 105°17′56″E
- Country: People's Republic of China
- Province: Sichuan
- Prefecture-level city: Suining
- District: Anju
- Village-level divisions: 3 residential communities 22 villages
- Elevation: 315 m (1,033 ft)
- Time zone: UTC+8 (China Standard)
- Area code: 0825

Baima (simplified Chinese: 白马; traditional Chinese: 白馬; pinyin: Báimǎ; lit. 'white horse') is a town of Anju District, Suining, Sichuan, People's Republic of China, situated about 27 kilometres (17 mi) southwest of downtown. As of 2020, it has three residential communities and 22 villages under its administration:

Neighborhoods

- Shunhe Community (顺河社区)
- Pingning Community (平宁社区)
- Wuyanjing Community (雾盐井社区)

Villages

- Baiguoshu Village (白果树村)
- Huatianba Village (花天坝村)
- Chenjiagou Village (陈家沟村)
- Zhipingsi Village (治平寺村)
- Xiaolongtang Village (小龙塘村)
- Baita Village (白塔村)
- Baimamiao Village (白马庙村)
- Qingfeng Village (青峰村)
- Baoquangou Village (宝泉沟村)
- Qingliangsi Village (清凉寺村)
- Shanlinsi Village (禅林寺村)
- Lianglukou Village (两路口村)
- Sifangjing Village (四方井村)
- Pilusi Village (毗庐寺村)
- Mazitan Village (麻子滩村)
- Huangtongpo Village (黄桶坡村)
- Buyun Village (步云村)
- Tongzhuwan Village (筒竹湾村)
- Huangyanjing Village (黄盐井村)
- Hebianjing Village (河边井村)
- Tandongzi Village (炭洞子村)
- Citongya Village (刺桐垭村)

== See also ==
- List of township-level divisions of Sichuan
