= Bailin Temple (Beijing) =

Tibetan Buddhist temple in Beijing, China

Coordinates: 39°56′41″N 116°24′49″E

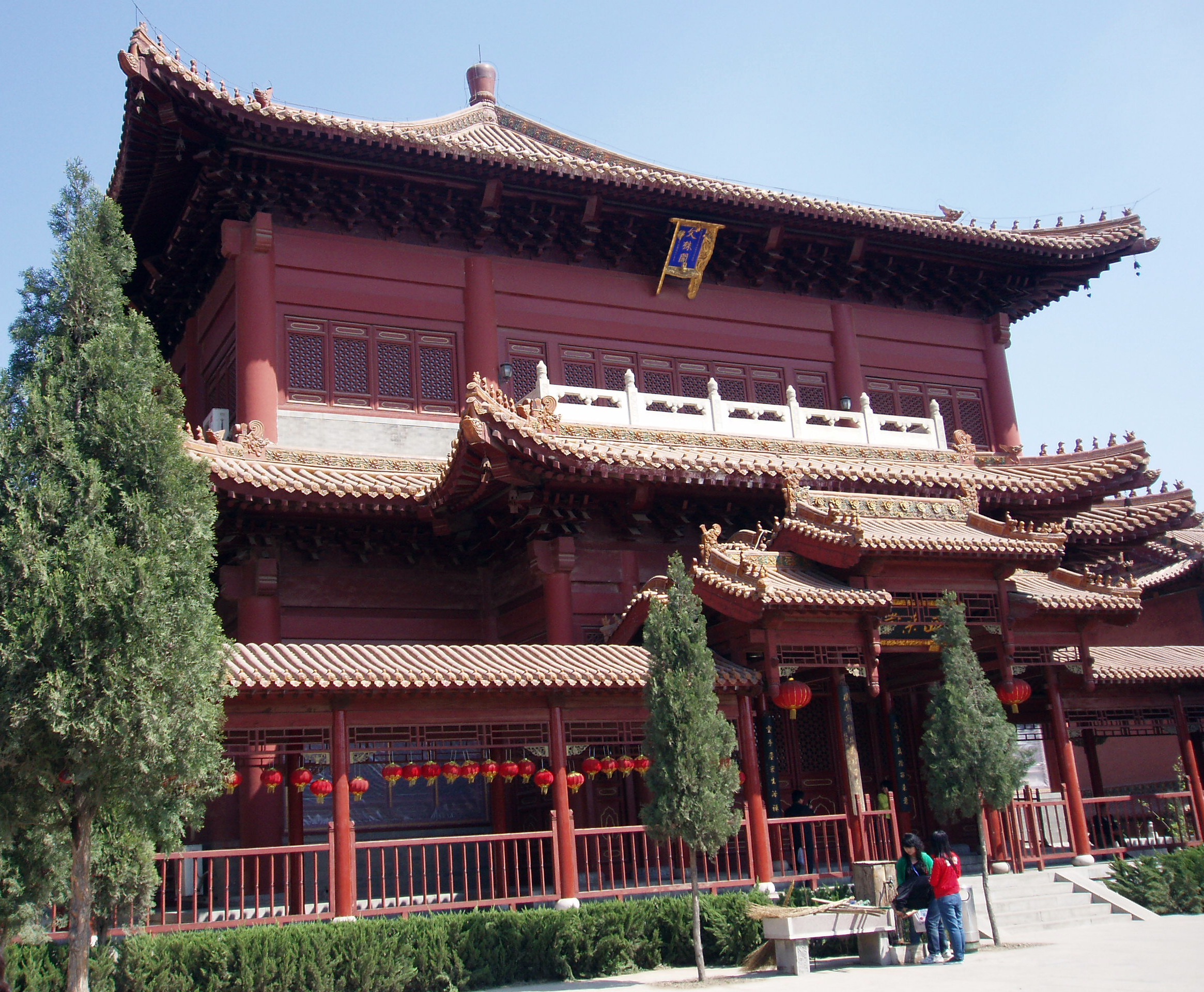

- Location of the temple in Beijing

Religion
- Affiliation: Tibetan Buddhism
- Ecclesiastical or organizational status: Temple and monastery

Location
- Location: Dongcheng District, Beijing
- Country: China
- Interactive map of Bailin Temple

Architecture
- Established: 1347

The Bailin Temple (Chinese: 柏林寺; pinyin: Bǎilín Sì; lit. 'Monastery of the Cypress Grove' is a 14th-century Tibetan Buddhist temple and monastery located in Beijing, China.

== History ==
=== Imperial era ===
Construction of the Bailin Temple started in 1347, during the reign of Yuan Emperor Shun, on an open tract of land in the capital, Dadu, to the east of the Temple of Confucius. The temple, the largest of its kind in Dadu, was occupied by the Sakya school of Tibetan Buddhism, which enjoyed great power under the Mongol emperors. The fortunes of the temple, though, were short-lived: in 1355, the Sakya were overthrown in Tibet by local warlords, and the Yuan Dynasty suffered the same fate 13 years later, in 1368, when Dadu was taken by a rebel army and pillaged.

Although the structure of the Bailin Temple mostly survived the event, the monastery fell into disrepair in the following decades. It remained so even after 1421, when the Ming Dynasty moved the capital back to the north, naming it Beijing. In 1447, the Zhengtong Emperor ordered a renovation of the monastery, and in the following years, a small square developed in front of the temple's main gate.

In 1644, Beijing was again taken by a rebel army and shortly afterwards occupied by the Manchus. Apparently, the Bailin Temple did not suffer heavy consequences from the wars. In 1694, a palace for Prince Yong, the fourth son of the Kangxi Emperor, was built directly west of the temple. The prestige of this new neighbour resulted in the gift of a monumental bell in 1707 and in a complete renovation of the monastery in 1713 on the occasion of the 60th birthday of the Kangxi Emperor. The works of renovation were directly supervised by Prince Yong himself, who, in 1722, succeeded to the throne as the Yongzheng Emperor. That same year, the new monarch donated part of his former palace to Tibetan lamas of the Gelug school, which would transform it, in a few decades, into the largest Tibetan temple outside Tibet, the Yonghegong Lamasery (雍和宫).

The rise of such a monastery resulted in a partial oblivion for Bailin Temple, which, by the end of the dynasty, had become dependent on its western counterpart. However, the generosity of the Qing emperors and the wealth of the Gelug school made sure that temple was kept in good repair. In 1758, the Qianlong Emperor ordered a lavish renovation of the buildings, part of his great project to shape Beijing into a monument to his power.

Like the Yonghegong Lamasery, Bailin Temple was not touched during the pillages of 1860 by Anglo-French forces and of 1900 by the Eight-Nation Alliance because of the superstitious fear that Tibetan Buddhism inspired to the invaders.

=== Warlord era ===
However, as the Qing Dynasty came to an end in 1911 and the capital was moved to Nanjing, Tibetan Buddhism came to be seen as a feudal and non-Han religion, and the temples entered into decadence.

According to the property register of the temple in 1931, the abbot was Master Taiyuan. The address for the temple was not 1 Xilou Hutong, but 4 Bailin Temple Hutong. The register records that there were more than 100 Buddhist statues, 18 cypress trees, one pine tree, a pair of steles, one stone spirit wall, and one pair of stone lions.

In 1931, the Abbot Taiyuan of Bailin Temple was rather famous in Beijing and was very active in upper-class circles. According to a memoir by Master Tanxu, Abbot Taiyuan was from northeast China; prior to his conversion, his secular name was Zhang Jiechen. His family was rather wealthy; however, after his father died, the wealth was quickly trifled away by family members. In 1924, Zhang Jiechen became a monk under Master Tanxu in Harbin.

In 1925, Taiyuan came to Beijing. In the following year, the warlord Zhang Zuolin became the new leader of the Northern Warlords Government of China. Since Taiyuan came from the same area as Zhang, he soon became friends with Zhang's Chief of Staff and was thus appointed abbot of Bailin Temple. In 1929, Master Taiyuan and a few Buddhist believers established a Buddhist academy inside the temple grounds. The next year, under the efforts of Master Taixu, the academy was reorganized on a larger scale. However, in 1931, the war between the Chinese and the Japanese in the Northeast had a serious effect on the financial resources of the temple. In 1932, it was announced that the academy would close. Since Taiyuan had always lived a rather luxurious life, he eventually decided he could not survive in Beijing anymore and moved to Sichuan, where he later died. Although Taiyuan was active in Beijing for only five or six years, his role in establishing the academy played a major part in advancing the study of Buddhism in Beijing.

=== Modern era ===
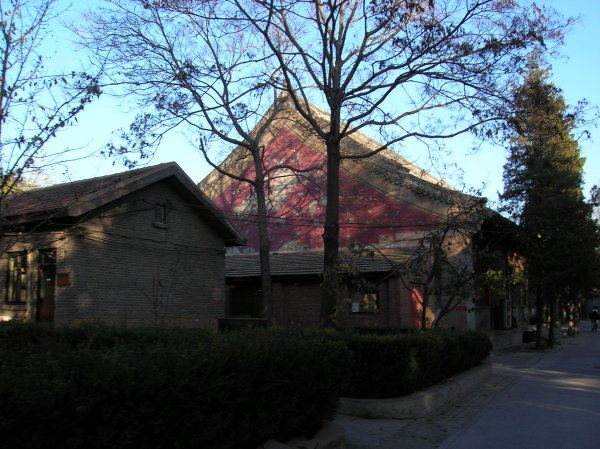
A view of the inner yard, with original buildings and pingfang

The phenomenon of decadence aggravated after the Communist takeover of Beijing in 1949. In August 1966, the temples were attacked by the Red Guards, who evacuated the lamas from the area and reorganised the buildings, including dormitories, stables, warehouses, and shrines outside the main temples, assigning them to Danwei. After this period, several brick structures were built inside Bailin Temple's walls, and the screenwall was linked to the main walls to create a closed courtyard. The Drum and Bell Towers were torn down, and the stone lions, the Buddhist statues, and two stone tablets displaying the rules to observe inside the temple disappeared. After the Tangshan earthquake (1976), the flow of refugees dramatically increased density in and around the temple.

In 1988, Bailin Temple was designated by the government to host the Cadre Academy of the Ministry of Culture/Central Academy of Cultural Administration (文化部干部学院) and the Beijing Historical Site Preservation Bureau, in addition to other private and public companies’ offices. In 1992, the government funded a renovation of the temple, which restored the original building but did not touch the new ones. Since 2007, the Beijing Cultural Heritage Protection Centre (CHP) has also established its headquarters in one of the buildings. In the autumn of the same year, a public mill (a stone slab used by the community in ancient times to grind cereals) in front of the temple was destroyed, as the road was leveled for easier traffic.

== Architecture and artwork ==
Detail of the decoration of the southern screenwall

The five main structures in the temple compound are laid out on a central axis. Proceeding from the front gate to the rear of the temple, they are as follows: the main gate, the Devaraja Hall (Hall of the Heavenly Kings), the Hall of Attaining Perfection (Yuanjuxingjuedian), the Mahavira Hall (Daxiongbaodian), and the Vimalakirti Hall or Hall of Bodhisattva Purity (Weimoge).

A horizontally inscribed plaque in the handwriting of the Kangxi Emperor, which reads "The Everlasting Cypress Grove" (Wangubailin) hangs on the façade of the Mahavira Hall, while statues of the Buddhas of the Three Worlds are found inside. Behind this hall is the Hall of Vimalakirti, containing seven carved and gilded Buddha images dating from the Ming Dynasty.

To the east of the main hall is an auxiliary hall containing two large bronze bells, 2.6 metes tall, cast in 1707. Their surfaces were cast with bas-reliefs of coiling dragons and a mantra to be intoned after a person's death in the hope of gaining passage to the Pure Land.

Among the valuable relics in the temple are a complete set of printing blocks for the Tripitaka, carved in the early 18th century. The collection has 7,240 volumes with a total of 78,230 separate blocks. Carved of high-grade pear wood, the blocks remain in fine condition today, except for some minor cracks. The work of carving took six years to complete and was begun in 1733, during the reign of the Yongzheng Emperor. However, fewer than 200 copies of the Tripitaka were printed during the ensuing 300 years, which is why the blocks remain in excellent condition.

The blocks were originally stored in the Hall of Military Eminence (Wuyingdian) in the Palace Museum, but were later transferred back to the temple. They are presently being cared for under the supervision of the Beijing Library.

== Location ==
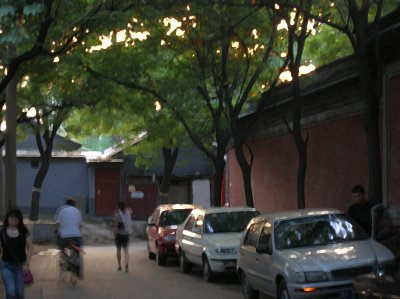
Bailin Hutong, with the old screenwall now transformed into the southern wall of the Temple

The Bailin Temple is located in Dongcheng District, Beijing. The postal address is: 1 Xilou Hutong, Beixinqiao, Dongcheng District, Beijing (北京市东城区北新桥戏楼胡同1号).

Bailin Temple is normally accessible only to people related to the institutions hosted in it. The gates open to the public on Cultural Heritage Day (June 8).

== Sources ==
- Beijing Cultural Heritage Protection Centre's Historical Research on Bailin Temple
- CHP Report on the Condition of Protected Heritage Areas in Beijing Old Town (2007
- 北京市规划委员会 (Beijing Municipal City Planning Commission), 北京旧城二十五片历史文化保护区保护规划 (Conservation of 25 Historic Areas in Beijing Old City), 北京燕山出版社 (Beijing Yanshan Chubanshe), 2002
- Xu Chengbei, Old Beijing – In the Shadow of the Imperial Throne, Foreign Languages Press 2001
- 1950北京市街道详图 (Complete Street Map of Beijing 1950), 中国地图出版社 (SinoMaps Press), 2004
- 北京历史地图 (Historical Maps of Beijing)，北京燕山出版社 (Beijing Lishi Chubanshe)
