= Shizuishan =

Shizuishan 石嘴山市 Shihtsuishan
- Prefecture-level city
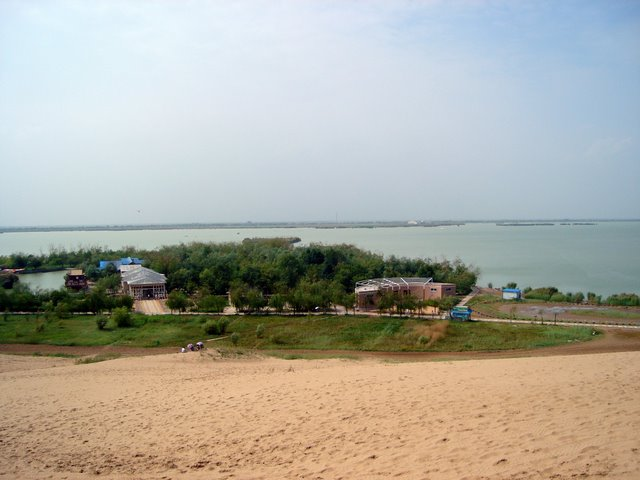

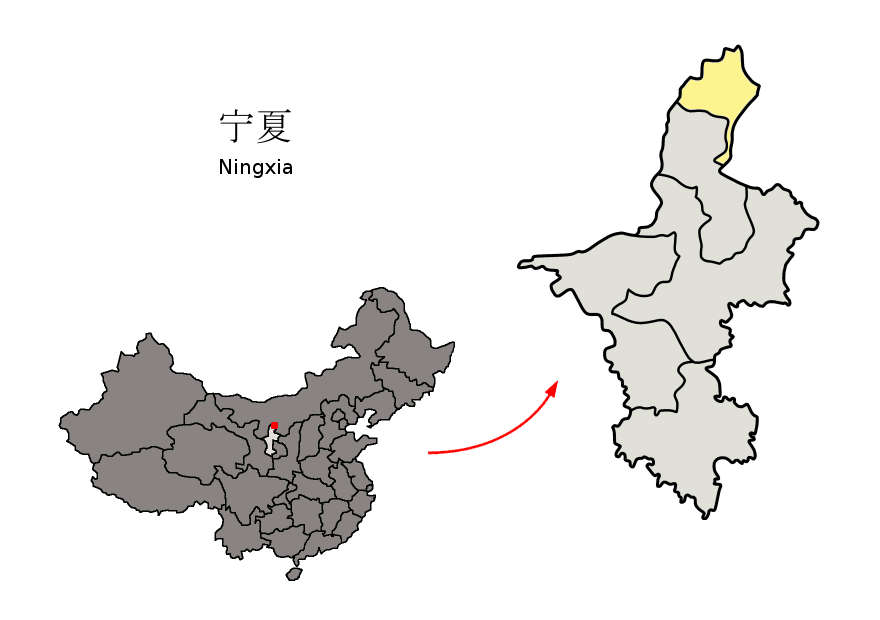
- The territory of Shizuishan prefecture-level city (yellow) within the Ningxia AR

- Location of the city center in Ningxia
- Coordinates (Shizuishan municipal government): 38°59′05″N 106°22′58″E
- Country: People's Republic of China
- Autonomous region: Ningxia
- Municipal seat: Dawukou District

Area
  - Prefecture-level city: 5,208.13 km^{2} (2,010.87 sq mi)
  - Urban (2018): 233 km^{2} (90 sq mi)

Population (2007)
  - Prefecture-level city: 730,400
  - Density: 140.2/km^{2} (363.2/sq mi)
  - Urban (2018): 720,000
  - Urban density: 3,100/km^{2} (8,000/sq mi)

GDP (nominal) (2025)
  - Prefecture-level city: CN¥ 57.9 billion US$ 8.1 billion
  - Per capita: CN¥ 78,400; US$ 10,976
- Time zone: UTC+8 (China Standard)
- ISO 3166 code: CN-NX-02
- Website: www.shizuishan.gov.cn

Shizuishan
- Chinese: 石嘴山
- Postal: Shetsuishan
- Literal meaning: Stony Beak Mountain
Transcriptions
Standard Mandarin
- Hanyu Pinyin: Shízuǐshān
- Wade–Giles: Shih-tsui-shan

Shizuishan, formerly Shizuizi, is a prefecture-level city in the Ningxia Hui Autonomous Region of the People's Republic of China. It is the northernmost prefecture in Ningxia and the second most populous, after the regional capital Yinchuan, bordered by Inner Mongolia to all directions except the south. Shizuishan sits on the western bank of the Yellow River on the western side of the Ordos Loop. It was formerly a center for caravans traveling the northern routes to and from Beijing across the Ordos Desert.

== Name ==
Shizuishan was formerly romanized as Shetsuishan and Shihchu Shan.

It was also formerly known as "Shizuizi", which was romanized Shihtsuitzu and Chetsouidze.

== History ==
Shizuishan used to be a center of local trade and eventually became a mining town. In 1934, Shizuishan was occupied by the army of warlord Sun Dianying during his attempt to conquer Ningxia from the Ma clique. Sun set up a rival provincial government in the town, but he was eventually defeated by Ningxia's official governor Ma Hongkui. Shizuishan was consequently returned to Ma's control.

== Administrative divisions ==
At the end of 2024, the resident population of the city was 739,400, a decrease of 11,500 compared with the end of the previous year. Among them, the urban population is 601,600 and the rural population is 137,800.

Map
Name	Hanzi	Hanyu Pinyin	Xiao'erjing	Population (2003 est.)	Area (km²)	Density (/km²)
Dawukou District	大武口区	Dàwǔkǒu Qū	دَاوُکِو ٿِيُوِ	230,000	1,007	228
Huinong District	惠农区	Hùinóng Qū	خُوِنْو ٿِيُوِ	200,000	1,088	184
Pingluo County	平罗县	Píngluó Xiàn	پِئٍ‌لُوَ ثِيًا	290,000	2,608	111

== Geography and climate ==
Shizuishan is located on the western bank of the Yellow River between latitudes 38° 21′ and 39° 25′ N and longitudes 105° 58′ and 106° 39′ E, spanning 88.8 km (55.2 mi) from east to west and 119.5 km (74.3 mi) from south to north.

Shizuishan experiences a cool arid climate (Köppen BWk) with freezing and very dry winters, alongside very warm to hot and somewhat wetter summers.

Climate data for Shizuishan, elevation 1,127 m (3,698 ft), (1991–2020 normals, extremes 1981–2010)
Month	Jan	Feb	Mar	Apr	May	Jun	Jul	Aug	Sep	Oct	Nov	Dec	Year
Record high °C (°F)	10.3 (50.5)	17.7 (63.9)	27.9 (82.2)	35.3 (95.5)	35.7 (96.3)	39.0 (102.2)	39.5 (103.1)	36.8 (98.2)	36.5 (97.7)	27.7 (81.9)	20.8 (69.4)	16.6 (61.9)	39.5 (103.1)
Mean daily maximum °C (°F)	−0.1 (31.8)	5.1 (41.2)	12.3 (54.1)	20.2 (68.4)	25.7 (78.3)	30.1 (86.2)	31.8 (89.2)	29.7 (85.5)	24.4 (75.9)	17.7 (63.9)	8.7 (47.7)	1.2 (34.2)	17.2 (63.0)
Daily mean °C (°F)	−7.4 (18.7)	−2.6 (27.3)	4.9 (40.8)	12.9 (55.2)	18.7 (65.7)	23.4 (74.1)	25.1 (77.2)	23.0 (73.4)	17.1 (62.8)	9.7 (49.5)	1.7 (35.1)	−5.7 (21.7)	10.1 (50.1)
Mean daily minimum °C (°F)	−13.5 (7.7)	−8.9 (16.0)	−1.7 (28.9)	5.4 (41.7)	10.9 (51.6)	15.9 (60.6)	18.6 (65.5)	17.0 (62.6)	11.2 (52.2)	3.4 (38.1)	−3.8 (25.2)	−11.2 (11.8)	3.6 (38.5)
Record low °C (°F)	−26.6 (−15.9)	−26.8 (−16.2)	−16.2 (2.8)	−9.5 (14.9)	−0.3 (31.5)	6.8 (44.2)	11.6 (52.9)	7.1 (44.8)	0.0 (32.0)	−8.5 (16.7)	−17.4 (0.7)	−25.6 (−14.1)	−26.8 (−16.2)
Average precipitation mm (inches)	1.5 (0.06)	1.9 (0.07)	4.0 (0.16)	4.8 (0.19)	13.6 (0.54)	27.0 (1.06)	51.1 (2.01)	31.8 (1.25)	25.9 (1.02)	8.1 (0.32)	2.9 (0.11)	0.7 (0.03)	173.3 (6.82)
Average precipitation days (≥ 0.1 mm)	1.8	1.1	2.1	2.3	4.2	6.0	8.0	7.6	6.7	3.2	1.3	1.1	45.4
Average snowy days	2.8	2.0	1.4	0.4	0	0	0	0	0	0.4	1.7	2.2	10.9
Average relative humidity (%)	51	42	36	31	36	43	53	58	61	53	54	53	48
Mean monthly sunshine hours	192.2	202.9	246.5	261.0	288.7	281.0	265.7	248.0	218.9	229.2	195.1	183.3	2,812.5
Percentage possible sunshine	63	66	66	65	65	63	59	59	59	67	66	63	63
Source: China Meteorological Administration

=== Environmental issues ===
Shizuishan was once described as the best place to make a film about the end of the world. In 2005, the Chinese government blacklisted the city for its pollution problem and told local leaders to shut down the worst polluting industrial plants. Recently, the city has attempted to reinvent itself by initiating eco-friendly programs to reduce pollution, improving medical services, increasing tourism, and improve certain industries but pollution is still taking its toll on the people.

== Economy ==
As of 2025, Shizuishan had a GDP of CN¥57.984 billion (US$8.118 billion) and a GDP per capita of CN¥78,400 (US$10,976). The economy of Shizuishan is mainly based on coal mining, coking, and metallurgy. Agriculture, tourism, and viticulture also contribute to Shizuishan's economy.

== Education ==
- Ningxia Institute of Science and technology
