= Yu Jin (Northern dynasties) =

Western Wei general (493–568)

- 于謹

Grand Tutor (太傅)
- In office 557–568
- Monarch: Emperor Xiaomin/Emperor Ming/Emperor Wu of Northern Zhou

Personal details
- Born: 493 Luoyang, Henan
- Died: 23 March 568 Xi'an, Shaanxi
- Relations: Yu Hu (brother)
- Children: Yu Shi; Yu Yí (于翼); Yu Yí (于義); Yu Yì (于儀); Yu Zhi; Yu Shao; Yu Bi; Yu Lan; Yu Kuang; Two daughters
- Parent: Yu Ziti (father)
- Courtesy name: Sijing (思敬)
- Nicknames: Jumi (巨彌); Juyin (巨引)
- Xianbei name: Wuniuyu Jin (勿忸于謹)
- Peerage: Duke of Yan (燕國公)
- Posthumous name: Wen (文)

Yu Jin (493–5 May 568), courtesy name Sijing, nicknamed Jumi and Juyin, Xianbei name Wuniuyu Jin, was a military general of the Northern Wei, Western Wei and Northern Zhou dynasties during the Northern and Southern dynasties period. During the fall of the Northern Wei, he came to prominence for his role in defeating the rebel, Poliuhan Baling and participated in several campaigns against other rebel groups and border defences. Following the defeat of the Erzhu clan to Gao Huan, he attached himself to Yuwen Tai and proposed to him the idea of moving Emperor Xiaowu of Wei and the capital westward to the Guanzhong region.

After the empire was split into two, Yu Jin fought many battles for the Western Wei against the Eastern Wei, distinguishing himself enough to become one of the Eight Zhuguo (八柱國). In 554, he captured Emperor Yuan of the Liang dynasty at the Battle of Jiangling, installing Xiao Cha as puppet ruler of the Western Liang. Following the death of Yuwen Tai in 556, he became the primary supporter in Yuwen Hu's consolidation of the imperial regency. Even as he became less active in his old age, he remained one of the most respected individuals under the Northern Zhou due to his past contributions and seniority.

== Background ==
Yu Jin was born in the Northern Wei capital of Luoyang as the son of Yu Ziti (于子提), the Administrator of Longxi Commandery and the Count of Maoping County. In his youth, he was known for being reserved, knowledgeable and generous. He was fond of reading the classics and records, especially the Art of War, but chose to spend his early years as a hermit in his hometown with no interest in becoming an official. Responding to someone trying to encourage him, he said, "County and commandery-level officials were despised by the ancients. To become one of the Three Excellencies, one must wait for the right opportunity. Hence why I choose to enjoy life back in my county; simply to kill time."

== Service under the Northern Wei ==
=== Campaign against the Rouran and Poliuhan Baling ===
In 523, Poliuhan Baling led the Six Garrisons into rebellion and allied with the Rouran Khaganate. The minister, Yuan Zuan (元纂) led an army to suppress the rebellion, and having long heard of Yu Jin's talent, recruited him as an officer for his campaign. The Rouran withdrew from the border upon hearing that the Wei army was approaching, so Yuan Zuan ordered Yu Jin to lead 2,000 cavalries in pursuit. Yu Jin confronted a Rouran army at Yudui Plains (郁對原; likely around modern southwest Mongolia), where he fought seventeen bouts before finally forcing them into submission.

Later, Yu Jin led his light cavalry across the border to spy on the Rouran, when he was suddenly confronted by several thousand Tiele cavalrymen. Outnumbered and unable to retreat, he ordered his troops to disperse and hide in the bushes while sending a few men to the top of a mountain to give out signals and pretend as if they were deploying his forces. The Tiele suspected an ambush, but relying on their numbers, they closed in on them regardless. Yu Jin was known by his enemies for riding either a purple horse or a black-mouthed yellow, so he ordered two of his men to ride these horses into the enemy formation. The Tiele recognized the horses and gave chase, prompting Yu Jin and the rest of his forces to reappear and charge against them. After scattering the Tiele cavalrymen, Yu Jin and his men returned safely back to Wei.

In 524, the Prince of Guangyang, Yuan Yuan, marched north to pacify the northern border and welcomed Yu Jin into his staff. The prince treated Yu Jin with special courtesy and discussed all his military plans with him, even sending his son to meet him and pay respect. Together, they routed Hulü Yegulu (斛律野谷祿) and other rebel enemies, but many bandits continued to spring up due to the turmoil in the empire. Yu Jin proposed to Yuan Yuan that they pacify the dissidents through peaceful and without resorting to arms, which the prince agreed. Since he was proficient in the languages of the various tribes, Yu Jin rode alone into the enemy ranks, offering them peace and his promise.

Through his diplomacy, Yu Jin was able to convince the Tiele chieftain, Mieliehe (乜列河), to surrender and move southward with 30,000 households. Yuan Yuan and Yu Jin agreed to meet him at Zhedun Ridge (折敷岭; northwest of present-day Datong, Shanxi), but as they waited, Yu Jin suspected that Mieliehe's movement may draw Poliuhan Baling's attention. He suggested that they lay in hiding, allowing Poliuhan to first intercept and plunder Mieliehe's people. His prediction came true as Poliuhan attacked and defeated Mieliehe at the ridge. While the rebels looted and took prisoners, Yu Jin carried out his ambush and decisively destroyed Poliuhan's forces. Mieliehe's followers then surrendered, and for suppressing the rebellion, Yu Jin was commended by Emperor Xiaoming of Wei and appointed Gathered Shooting General.

=== Further campaigns against rebels and the Liang dynasty ===
In 526, Yu Jin participated in Yuan Yuan's campaign against Xianyu Xiuli in Hebei. They first stopped at Bainiuluo (白牛邏; southeast of present-day Boye County, Hebei) before resuming their advance, but halted again at Zhongshan after hearing that the rebels had killed the Prince of Zhangwu, Yuan Rong (元融). The Palace Attendant, Yuan Yan (元晏) accused Yuan Yuan and Yu Jin to Empress Dowager Hu of intentionally delaying their campaign to plot rebellion, which she believed and set up notice for Yu Jin's arrest. Hearing the situation, Yu Jin volunteered on behalf of Yuan Yuan to give himself up and plead their innocence before the court. The Empress Dowager was furious when she met Yu Jin, but he prepared a statement detailing Yuan Yuan's loyalty and explaining the reasons for the delays. Her anger subsided, and both Yu Jin and Yuan Yuan were acquitted.

Around the same time, the Liang dynasty general, Cao Yizong (曹義宗), repeatedly attacked the Northern Wei's southern border from his base in Rangcheng (穰城; present-day Dengzhou, Henan). Emperor Xiaoming ordered Yu Jin and another general, Xin Zuan (辛纂) to oppose him, and for two years, they fought many battles with the Liang.

In 528, Yuan Ziyou, posthumously known as Emperor Xiaozhuang, ascended the throne and appointed Yu Jin as General Who Guards Distant Lands, but he was soon transferred to the imperial court. He then followed the Grand Chancellor, Yuan Tianmu in pacifying Ge Rong and Xing Gao that same year.

Between 529 and 530, Yu Jin served as a lieutenant under Erzhu Tianguang in his campaign against the rebel, Wanqi Chounu in the Guanzhong region, and after Chounu's defeat, he was enfeoffed as the Earl of Shicheng County. In 531, he accompanied Tianguang in suppressing the rebellion of Suqin Mingda, and later defeated the bandit He Suiyoufa (賀遂有伐) and others in Xia province.

=== Joining Yuwen Tai and moving the capital westward ===
In late 531, Erzhu Tianguang and his family converged to fight the rebel general, Gao Huan in Hebei. Yu Jin accompanied him in the campaign, but after the Erzhu forces were routed at the Battle of Hanling, he occupied Tong Pass and defected to the general, Heba Yue. Heba Yue petitioned to retain Yu Jin as a border commander, appointing him General of the Guards and Administrator of Xingyang. In 533, after Yuwen Tai was made the Inspector of Xia province by Heba Yue, Yu Jin was assigned by Yuwen as the Grand Chief Controller of Fancheng while concurrently serving as the Chief Clerk of Xia.

In 534, Heba Yue was assassinated and Yuwen Tai moved to Pingliang to assume leadership over the generals in the Guanzhong. At the time, Emperor Xiaowu of Wei was in Luoyang, where he was at odds with Gao Huan, now the paramount general of the empire. Therefore, Yu Jin advised Yuwen to seize the moment and said:

The Guanzhong was the heart of the Qin and Han dynasties and known by the ancients as the land of abundance. Its soldiers are braves and its lands are fertile. To the west lies the bountiful region of Ba–Shu, while to the north is the boon of horses and sheep. Now if we seize the strategic passes, gather the heroes, train the troops and encourage the farmers, then we will be in a position to observe the changing times. Furthermore, the Emperor at Luoyang is under threat by the bandits. My Lord, if you are truly sincere and consider the advantages and disadvantages of the current situation, then you would request for the capital to be moved to the Guanzhong; the Emperor will undoubtedly be more than happy to move westward. Then, once the Emperor is in your grasp, you may command the feudal lords and quell the tyranny and rebellion by imperial decree. The achievements of Huan and Wen can only come once in a millennium.

Yuwen agreed with Yu Jin's proposal. Coincidentally, Yu Jin was summoned by Xiaowu to Luoyang to take up a post, giving him the opportunity to share his plans and receive the emperor's approval. The plan was soon discovered by Gao Huan, who then led an army to Luoyang, forcing Xiaowu and Yu Jin to flee west. Yu Jin later followed Yuwen Tai to attack Tong Pass and captured Huiluo city (回洛城; in present-day Mengjin, Henan). For his deeds, Yu Jin was ordered to hold tally, granted equal privileges of the Three Excellencies and appointed General of Chariots and Cavalry and Inspector of Northern Yong province. His peerage was also promoted to the Duke of Lantian.

== Service under the Western Wei ==
=== War with the Eastern Wei ===
With Emperor Xiaowu in the Guanzhong, the empire was thus split into two, with Yuwen Tai leading the Western Wei and Gao Huan leading the Eastern Wei. In 535, Yu Jin was made Grand General of Agile Cavalry and Minister of State with the Privileges of the Three Excellencies.

In 537, Wang Youlang (王遊浪) rebelled against the Western Wei and occupied Yangshi Ramparts (楊氏壁; northeast of present-day Huayin, Shaanxi), but Yu Jin led his forces and captured him. Later that year, the Western Wei invaded Eastern Wei, and Yu Jin marched as far as Pandou (盤豆; northwest of modern-day Lingbao City, Henan), where he defeated the general, Gao Shuli (高叔禮). He then capitalized by pressing on to Hongnong and capturing the Inspector of Shan province, Li Huibo (李徽伯). In the ensuing Battle of Shayuan, Yu Jin fought with distinction alongside Yuwen Tai and dealt Gao Huan a heavy defeat. For his achievements, his fief was elevated to the Duke of Changshan.

In 538, Yu Jin accompanied Yuwen Tai during the Battle of Heqiao, and after the battle, he was given the office of Chief Secretary of the Prime Minister's Office while concurrently serving as Grand Branch Censorate of the Masters of Writing. That same year, the Inspector of Xia and a chieftain of the Jihu people, Liu Ping (劉平), rebelled, but Yu Jin quelled the uprising. Hence, he was further promoted to Grand Chief Controller and Commander of military affairs of the five provinces of Heng, Bing, Yan, Si and Yun, General-in-Chief, Inspector of Heng province and later, the Grand Tutor to the Crown Prince.

In 543, Yu Jin participated in another campaign against the Eastern Wei, capturing Baiguwu (柏谷塢; southeast of Yanshi, Henan) after a great victory. Later at the Battle of Moung Mang, the Western Wei suffered a defeat to the Eastern Wei and had to retreat. Yu Jin pretended to surrender to the Eastern Wei and ordered his troops to stand on the side of the roads. Gao Huan took the opportunity to chase after the retreating Western Wei soldiers without caution. Once the enemy cavalry passed, Yu Jin then attacked them from behind and cause panic within their ranks. Dugu Xin also gathered his soldiers and joined Yu Jin's assault, sending Gao Huan's men into disarray and saving the retreating Western Wei forces.

In 546, Yu Jin was appointed Left Supervisor of the Masters of Writing and led the Ministry of Agriculture. The following year, the Eastern Wei commander in Henan, Hou Jing, surrendered to the Western Wei and requested for troops. Yuwen Tai sent Li Bi with an army to reinforce him despite opposition from Yu Jin, who believed they should first award Hou Jing with rewards and high positions to observe his true intention. Soon, Yuwen Tai once again made Yu Jin the Chief Secretary of the Prime Minister's Office and Grand Branch Censorate of the Masters of Writing before stationing him at Tongguan. He was also assigned as the Inspector of Hua province, and afterwards, the Minister of Works.

In 549, Yu Jin was officially promoted to a Pillar of State alongside seven other top ranking officials including Yuwen Tai. After Gao Yang took the throne and established the Northern Qi dynasty in 550, Yuwen Tai brought an army to in response with Yu Jin serving as the Grand Chief Controller of the Rear Army. In 554, Yu Jin was appointed the Inspector of Yong province.

=== Battle of Jiangling ===
In 554, Yu Jin was ordered to lead a campaign against Emperor Yuan of Liang at Jiangling. Before his departure, Yuwen Tai held a farewell banquet for him at Qingni Valley (青泥谷; in present-day Lantian County, Shaanxi), during which he was asked by the official, Zhangsun Jian, about his thoughts on Emperor Yuan's likely strategy. Yu Jin told him, “Flaunt his military might between the Han and Mian rivers, sweep across the Yangzi, and only hold on to Danyang – this is his best strategy. Relocate the surrounding residents within the walls, withdraw into the inner city, fortify the defenses and wait for reinforcements – this is a sensible strategy. If relocation proves difficult, then hold out in the outer city – this is his worst strategy.”

Zhangshun then asked him which strategy Emperor Yuan will choose, and Yu Jin believed the worst. When asked why, Yu Jin replied, “The Xiao clan have lived south of the Yangzi for centuries. The Central Plains is plagued by trouble and yet they have no time to plan for external affairs. They see the threat the (Northern) Qi pose to us and assume we are incapable of dividing our forces. Moreover, Xiao Yi (Emperor Yuan) is without strategy, suspicious and indecisive. The ignorant masses under him will be difficult to reason with, clinging to their hometowns and loathing at the thought of relocation. Therefore, he will use the worst strategy.”

Yu Jin deployed Yuwen Hu and Yang Zhong with elite cavalry to seize the Yangzi crossings, cutting off the Liang forces’ escape routes. The Liang built a wooden wall around the outer city, which Yu Jin surrounded soon after his arrival. Emperor Yuan led several attacks from the south but was repeatedly defeated. After 16 days of siege, the wall fell and the Liang emperor retreated into the inner city. A few days later, he and his subjects, including his crown prince, came out to surrender with their hands tied behind their back. Emperor Yuan was later executed by Xiao Cha, who was then installed by the Western Wei as Emperor of the Western Liang. Yu Jin seized more than 100,000 people of Liang as well as several precious treasures from the treasury. According to the Book of Liang, Yu Jin selected tens of thousands from the captured men and women, forced them into slavery and relocated them back to the Western Wei capital, Chang’an while killing the weak and young. During the march back north, many of the captives either died from the cold, exhaustion or from being trampled.

After returning victorious, Yuwen Tai personally visited Yu Jin and held a feast for him. He was rewarded a thousand slaves, the treasure from Liang and a collection of bronze, stone, silk and bamboo musical instruments. He was also bestowed the title of Duke of Xinye with a fief of 2,000 households, which he firmly refused but Yuwen Tai insisted. Additionally, Yuwen Tai ordered his music officials to compose ten songs, all titled “The Song of Duke Changshan Pacifying Liang” (常山公平梁歌) and had musicians perform them.

=== Supporting Yuwen Hu's regency ===
After the victory at Jiangling, Yu Jin felt that he had rendered his services long enough and that his achievements were already established. He indicated his desire to retire by offering Yuwen Tai his fine steed and armour. Yuwen read his intentions but denied his request, stating that the realm was still not at peace. In 556, when the Six Titled Retainers was established, Yu Jin was made Grand Minister of Justice.

Yuwen Tai died later that year, leaving behind his eldest son, Yuwen Jue who was still young. Before his death, he entrusted his sons and the management of state affairs over to his nephew, the Duke of Zhongshan, Yuwen Hu. However, Yuwen Hu lacked prestige among the nobility, and with the princes and officials vying for power, he privately met with Yu Jin to seek his advice. Yu Jin promised to give Yuwen Hu his endorsement and also encouraged him to accept his government responsibilities.

The next day at a meeting with Yuwen Hu and the princes, Yu Jin firmly declared his support for Yuwen Hu, stating, “In the past, when the imperial family was in danger, the people plotted to seize the throne. The late Prime Minister (Yuwen Tai) was determined to save the state, taking up arms and shouldering responsibility. Thus, the state was saved and the people followed its will. Now, Heaven has sent disaster upon us and abandoned the common people. Though the Prime Minister’s heir is young, the Duke of Zhongshan (Yuwen Hu) was like a son to him, and he has been entrusted with the mandate of the imperial regent. Both military and state affairs must naturally fall to him.” The princes were shocked by the declaration, and Yuwen Hu replied, “This is a family matter. Ignorant as I may be, how can I dare refuse?”

As Yu Jin was seen as having the same seniority and status as Yuwen Tai, Yuwen Hu always treated him with courtesy and respect. Soon enough, Yu Jin stepped forth and professed to Yuwen Hu, “If you take charge of military and national affairs, then we will have someone to rely upon.” He then knelt down and kowtowed twice. The princes and ministers, under pressure from Yu Jin, followed suit, thus reaching a consensus.

== Service under the Northern Zhou ==
In 557, Yuwen Hu installed Yuwen Jue, posthumously known as Emperor Xiaomin of Northern Zhou, to the throne emperor, thus establishing the Northern Zhou dynasty. Yu Jin was granted the title of Duke of Yan and a fief of 10,000 households. He was promoted to the office of Grand Tutor and Grand Minister of Rites, overseeing government affairs with Li Bi, Houmochen Chong and others. When Helan Xiang attacked the Tuyuhun, Yu Jin commanded the army remotely and gave him strategies.

By 562, Yu Jin was at an advanced age and petitioned to resign from his office, but Emperor Wu of Northern Zhou, rejected it, believing that his talents were still required. In 563, despite his refusal, Emperor Wu held a special ceremony dedicated for Yu Jin to pay respect to him. In 564, Yuwen Hu led a campaign against the Northern Qi, and despite Yu Jin being ill from old age, he was asked to follow for Yuwen to consult on military strategy. When the army returned, he was awarded with bells and chimes. In 567, Yuwen Hu gifted him a comfortable carriage and soon appointed him the Inspector of Yong province.

On 23 March 568, Yu Jin died in office at the age of 76. Emperor Wu ordered the prince, Yuwen Jian (宇文儉) to oversee the funeral and personally attended to offer his condolences. The emperor offered Yu Jin 1,000 pieces of silk and 5,000 bushels of millet and wheat. Along with giving him his original official title, Yu Jin was posthumously given tally and appointed Grand Preceptor, Commander of military affairs in twenty provinces including Yong and Heng as well as Inspector of Yong province. He was granted the posthumous name of "Wen". As he was about to be buried, all the officials from princes down to the lower ranks escorted him to the suburbs, and the court enshrined him in the temple of Yuwen Tai.

== Sources ==
- Book of Zhou
- Book of Liang
- History of the Northern Dynasties
- Zizhi Tongjian
