= Li Bi (Northern dynasties) =

Western Wei and Northern Zhou general (494–557)

- 李弼

Grand Tutor (太傅)
- In office 556–557
- Monarch: Emperor Gong of Western Wei/Emperor Xiaomin of Northern Zhou/Emperor Ming of Northern Zhou

Personal details
- Born: 494 Liaoyang, Liaoning
- Died: 14 November 557 Xi'an, Shaanxi
- Relations: Li Mi (great-grandson)
- Children: Li Yao; Li Hui; Li Yǎn; Li Lun; Li Yàn; Li Chun
- Parent: Li Yong (father)
- Courtesy name: Jinghe (景和)
- Xianbei name: Tuhe Bi (徒河弼)
- Peerage: Duke of Zhao (趙國公)
- Posthumous name: Wu (武); Duke of Wei (魏國公)

Li Bi (494–14 November 557), courtesy name Jinghe, Xianbei name Tuhe Bi, was a Chinese military general of the Northern Wei, Western Wei and Northern Zhou during the Northern and Southern dynasties period. He came to prominence under Erzhu Tianguang during his campaign to pacify the Guanzhong, and in the power struggle that followed Heba Yue's assassination, he initially sided with Houmochen Yue before defecting to Yuwen Tai. After Yuwen founded the Western Wei in 534, Li Bi fought in numerous campaigns against the Eastern Wei, most notably the Battle of Shayuan, where he proposed and led a decisive ambush against Gao Huan's forces. As one of the state's most distinguished generals, he became one of the Eight Zhuguo (八柱國) in 548.

== Background ==
Li Bi's family were natives of Xiangping County, Liaodong Commandery. His ancestor, Li Gen (李根), was a Gentleman at the Yellow Gates under Murong Chui during the Later Yan dynasty. His grandfather, Li Guichou (李貴醜), was the Inspector of Ping province, while his father Li Yong (李永), was a Palace Counsellor and posthumously appointed the Inspector of Liang province. Since his youth, Li Bi possessed great ambitions and immense physical strength. He was also described as a calm and resolute individual with profound insight, and during his years as an official, he was very devoted in his duty.

When the Northern Wei fell into turmoil, he said to his relatives, "A real man must tread on the sharp edge of a sword. Quelling the troublemakers and bringing peace to the state is the only way to gain fame and honour. How can one rely on rank and status to gain a highly position?"

== Service under Northern Wei ==
=== Campaigns in Guanzhong ===
In 528, the general, Erzhu Tianguang summoned Li Bi to serve as his subcolonel. In 530, Erzhu Tianguang was commissioned to lead an expedition into the Guanzhong region and pacify the rebels. Li Bi followed Erzhu, and at Chishui (赤水; in present-day Weinan, Shaanxi), he helped him defeat bandit forces from Shu that were blocking his path, earning him a promotion to General Who Attacks Barbarians and the fiefly title of Count of Shimen County. Later, he accompanied Heba Yue in his campaign against Moqi Chounu, Moqi Daoluo (万俟道洛) and Wang Qingyun (王慶雲), crushing them all. Li Bi often led the vanguard into battle and was undefeated. The rebels feared Li Bi and warned each other not to stand in his way.

When Erzhu Tianguang went to Luoyang later in 530, Li Bi was placed under the command of Houmochen Yue, serving as Grand Chief Controller with the title of Regular Mounted Attendant. In 532, Li Bi was made Administrator of Qinghe Commandery and Grand Judge of Heng province. He was later appointed as Inspector of Souther Qin province and followed Houmochen in several expeditions, winning many victories.

=== Hequ Incident ===
In 534, Houmochen Yue, under orders from the paramount general, Gao Huan, assassinated Heba Yue at Hequ to take control over the Guanzhong region. He returned to Long province (隴州; in modern Baoji, Shaanxi), but soon after, Heba's subordinates at Pingliang acclaimed Yuwen Tai as their new leader and then marched to attack him. Houmochen sought Li Bi's advice, who said, "Heba Yue was innocent but yet you punished him. You failed to appease his followers, so they were left without a place to go. Yuwen of Xiazhou took them in and employed them, thus earning their undying loyalty. Now everyone wants to avenge their late master, and their intentions are certainly not small. You should disband your troops and apologize, otherwise, we will surely suffer disaster." However, Houmochen was left confused and did not know what to do.

Believing that Houmochen's demise was inevitable, Li Bi told his relatives, "Yuwen of Xiazhou is a man of unparallel talent and strategy, with his virtue and righteousness worthy of respect. Meanwhile, Duke Houmochen is a man with little wisdom but grand ambitions. How can he protect himself? If we do not act sensibly, we may end up with him and our entire clan destroyed. When Yuwen Tai's army arrived, Houmochen abandoned Qin province and fled south to secure the strategic locations.

The following day, Li Bi sent an envoy to Yuwen, promising to defect from Houmochen and surrender. That night, Li Bi gathered his soldiers mounted on donkeys and camels before announcing, "Duke Houmochen wishes to return to Qin province. Why have you all not packed your bags?" Li Bi was married to Houmochen's aunt and was a particularly trusted confidant, so his followers panicked and all rushed towards Qin. Li Bi arrived first at the province on horseback, comforting them at the city gates and then bringing them to surrender to Yuwen Tai.

When the two met each other, Yuwen Tai said to Li Bi, "So long as you and I are of one mind, we can pacify the world." After Houmochen Yue was defeated later that year, the captured gold, silver and servants were handpicked and given to Li Bi as rewards. Yuwen then ordered him to guard Yuan province (原州; roughly in modern Guyuan, Ningxia) in his original positions, and he was later appointed as Inspector of Qin province.

== Service under Western Wei ==
=== Battle of Xiaoguan ===
Shortly after Houmochen's defeat, Yuwen Tai founded the Western Wei, competing with Gao Huan and his Eastern Wei. In 535, he led his army east with Li Bi serving as his Chief Controller. Leading the right army, Li Bi attacked Tongguan and Huiluo city (回洛城; in present-day Mengjin, Henan), occupying them.

In 537, Li Bi was appointed Inspector of Yong province with equal ceremonials to the Three Excellencies, and soon, he was promoted to General of the Cavalry and granted Privileges of the Three Excellencies. When Gao Huan brought his forces to invade Western Wei that year, Li Bi followed Yuwen Tai to fight the contingent led by Dou Tai at Xiaoguan (小關; south of Tongguan County, Shaanxi). He led the vanguard into battle and captured most of the enemies. Dou Tai's army was destroyed, and he was forced to commit suicide. Yuwen awarded Li Bi Dou's steed and armour for his reward. He then followed Yuwen to occupy Hongnong.

=== Battle of Shayuan ===
Later that year, Yuwen Tai faced Gao Huan again at the Battle of Shayuan, and Li Bi commanded the right army. The Eastern Wei forces significantly outnumbered the Western Wei. Therefore Li Bi proposed to Yuwen that they occupy the Weiqu river (渭曲; southeast of present-day Dali County, Shaanxi) in the east, where they can lie in ambush among the reeds and attack at the appropriate moment when they sound the drums. When the Eastern Wei troops fell into the ambush and engaged with the left army led by Zhao Gui, Li Bi brought with him 60 cavalrymen to attack them horizontally, thereby separating the Eastern Wei army into two. The Western Wei forces slaughtered them, incurring Gao Huan a great defeat. For his role in the battle, Li Bi was given the honourific title of "Specially Advanced" and enfeoffed as the Duke of Zhao Commandery.

=== Battle of Heqiao ===
In October or November, Li Bi and Heba Sheng conquered Hedong Commandery and pacified the provinces of Fen and Jiang (絳州; roughly southwest Shanxi). In 538, when Yuwen Tai marched east to rescue Dugu Xin under siege by Eastern Wei forces at Jinyong, Li Bi commanded the vanguard. The Eastern Wei general, Moduolou Daiwen led several thousand soldiers and suddenly reached Gucheng (谷城; near present-day Luoyang, Henan) at night, where Li Bi and another general, Daxi Wu was camped. Li Bi hurriedly sent his soldiers to shout and beat the drums, dragging firewood to bring about a cloud dust. Moduolou thought the main Western Wei forces had arrived and retreated, but Li Bi pursued him relentlessly, capturing his soldiers and beheading him. Moduolou's head was then passed around the Western Wei soldiers.

The next day, Yuwen Tai and Gao Huan faced off at Heqiao (河穚; southwest of present-day Mengzhou, Henan). Li Bi penetrated deep into the enemy lines and was wounded seven times. He was also captured and surrounded by several layers of guards. Li Bi feigned serious injury and suddenly collapsed to the ground, causing the guards to slightly relax. Then, he spotted a horse nearby, soon he swiftly jumped onto the horse and galloped west, thus escaping.

=== Later battles against Eastern Wei ===
In 539, Li Bi was appointed the Minister of Works. In 540, the Eastern Wei general, Hou Jing, seized Jing province, so Li Bi and Dugu Xin attacked and forced him into retreat. In 543, Li Bi also participated in the Battle of Mount Mang and was later promoted to Grand Commandant.

In 547, Hou Jing rebelled against the Eastern Wei and offered the six provinces of the Henan to the Western Wei. The Eastern Wei sent the general, Han Gui to attack Hou Jing through Yingchuan. Yuwen Tai sent Li Bi to lead troops to reinforce Hou Jing, with all the generals accepting Li Bi's command. Han Gui withdrew as soon as Li Bi's forces arrived. His peer, Wang Sizheng, then occupied Yingchuan Commandery, but another Eastern Wei general, Hulü Jin, was also leading troops to intercept the Western Wei forces, so Li Bi and the others decided to withdraw.

=== Pillar of State ===
In 548, the northern Jihu tribes rebelled, and Li Bi suppressed them. For his military achievements, Li Bi was promoted to Grand Protector and given the exclusive title of Pillar of State along with seven other officials including Yuwen Tai. In 552, as part of Yuwen Tai's policy of enforcing Xianbei surnames, Li Bi was given the surname of "Tuhe" (徒河). Later, when Yuwen Tai went west to carry out an inspection, Li Bi was ordered to stay behind to stand guard and handle with all state matters.

In 556, when the Six Titled Retainers was established, Li Bi was appointed as the Grand Tutor and Grand Minister Over the Masses. That same year, the Rouran Khaganate in the northern steppe were defeated by the Göktürks, prompting them to surrender to Western Wei. Li Bi therefore led the vanguard to welcome them. After Yuwen Tai died and his nephew Yuwen Hu took charge of the government, Li Bi was one of the few officials that he consulted with to discuss important affairs.

== Death and posthumous honours ==
In 557, Yuwen Hu forced Emperor Gong of Western Wei to abdicate the throne to Yuwen Jue, hence establishing the Northern Zhou dynasty. Li Bi was re-appointed the Grand Tutor and promoted to the Duke of Zhao Commandery. However, just a few months later, he died in office at the age of 64. Emperor Ming of Zhou carried out a mourning period on the same day he died. On the day of his burial, the emperor visited his funeral three times and also sent soldiers to dig up his tomb to present him with large carriages and dragon flags. The soldiers then all lined up at his tomb. Li Bi was given the posthumous name of Wu, and later the posthumous title of Duke of Wei. He was also enshrined in the ancestral temple of Yuwen Tai.

== See also ==
- Book of Wei
- Book of Zhou
- Book of Northern Qi
- History of the Northern Dynasties
- Zizhi Tongjian
