= Houmochen Chong =

Western Wei and Northern Zhou general (513–563)

- 侯莫陳崇

Grand Minister Over the Masses (大司徒)
- In office 559–563
- Monarch: Emperor Ming of Northern Zhou/Emperor Wu of Northern Zhou

Personal details
- Born: 513 Wuchuan County, Inner Mongolia
- Died: 563 Xi'an, Shaanxi
- Children: Houmochen Rui; Houmochen Ying; Houmochen Hui; One daughter
- Parent: Houmochen Jing (father)
- Courtesy name: Shangle (尚樂)
- Peerage: Duke of Liang (梁國公)
- Posthumous name: Zhao (躁); Zhuangmin (莊閔)

Houmochen Chong (513–563), courtesy name Shangle, was a Xianbei military general of the Northern Wei, Western Wei and Northern Zhou during the Northern and Southern dynasties. He joined Erzhu Rong's army at a young age, and during Erzhu Tianguang and Heba Yue's expedition in the Guanzhong region, he personally captured the rebel leader, Moqi Chounu in battle. Houmochen later joined Yuwen Tai, who founded the Western Wei, and further distinguished himself in campaigns against Houmochen Yue and the Eastern Wei before eventually becoming one of the Eight Zhuguo (八柱國) in 549. He continued to hold important civil positions under the Northern Zhou, but in 563, he was forced to commit suicide after he spread a prophecy that the regent, Yuwen Hu would die that year.

== Service under Northern Wei ==
=== Early life and career ===
Houmochen Chong's ancestors were a branch of the ruling Tuoba tribe of Northern Wei, and originally lived along the Kuhuzhen River. His fifth generation ancestor was Taiguduhou (太骨都侯), and the Houmochen served as chieftains from Taiguduhou onwards. Houmochen Chong's father, Houmochen Yun (侯莫陳允 or 侯莫陳雲) was well-off and assigned to garrison the Wuchuan frontier town in Dai commandery, where he and his family settled down. Chong's father, Houmochen Xing (侯莫陳興) was appointed General of the Palace and Feathered Forest Imperial Guard.

At a young age, Houmochen was described as brave and good at horseback archery, but also cautious and taciturn. In 528, at the age of 15, Houmochen followed Heba Yue and Erzhu Rong to attack the rebel, Ge Rong. In 529, he accompanied the Prince of Shandang, Yuan Tianmu to suppress the rebellion of Xing Gao in Qing province, earning the office of General Who Establishes Might for his military deeds. Later that year, he followed Heba Yue to defeat Yuan Hao and Chen Qingzhi at Luoyang and was promoted to General of the Imperial Guards.

=== Pacifying the Guanzhong ===
In 530, Houmochen was one of the generals assigned to Erzhu Tianguang's western expedition to pacify the Guanzhong region. Along the way, he helped Heba Yue in defeating bandits from the Shu region at Chishui (赤水; in present-day Weinan, Shaanxi). The most prominent rebel leader in the Guanzhong was Moqi Chounu, who proclaimed himself as emperor two years prior. Hearing of the Wei army's arrival, Moqi laid siege to Qi province and sent his general, Yuchi Pusa (尉遲菩薩) towards Wugong County. Houmochen fought with distinction in the campaign, defeating and pursuing the enemies before helping in lifting the siege on Qi. Later, he marched to Bailixichuan (百里細川; southwest of present-day Lingtai County, Gansu), where he captured the camp of the rebel general, Hou Yuanjin (侯元進).

As the Wei forces encroached on his base in Anding, Moqi Chounu attempted to flee to Gaoping Commandery. Houmochen led his light cavalry to pursue and caught up with him at Changkeng (長坑; in present-day Pingliang, Gansu) in Jing province. Before Moqi could deploy his soldiers, Houmochen rode into the enemy ranks alone and captured Moqi alive on horseback. He then shouted loudly at the enemies, causing them to scatter with no one daring to approach him. When the main forces arrived, the rebels fled, earning the Wei a complete victory. Heba Yue rewarded Houmochen with Moqi Chounu's steed, sword and golden belt. He was also appointed General Who Stabilises the North, Palace Counsellor, Chief Controller and Chief Controller, as well as bestowed the fiefly title of Marquis of Linjing County.

=== Campaign against Houmochen Yue ===
In 534, Heba Yue was assassinated by the Inspector of Qin province, Houmochen Yue (no known relation to Houmochen Chong) under the orders of the paramount general, Gao Huan. Houmochen Chong and the rest of Heba's generals converged at Pingliang, where they elected the Inspector of Xia province, Yuwen Tai to succeed Heba as their leader and defeat Houmochen Yue. Yuwen dispatched Houmochen Chong with 1,000 light cavalry to attack the Inspector of Yuan province, Shi Gui (史歸).

Houmochen Chong marched quietly through the night, leading only seven cavalrymen to the city walls while the rest of his troops laid in ambush on the nearby roadsides. Seeing his very small detachment, Shi Gui did not see him as a threat and laid down his guard, but Houmochen was able to quickly break in and occupy the city gates. Li Yuan and his brothers knew that Houmochen was coming, so they began to clamour inside and outside the city, signalling for Houmochen's ambush troops to come out. Houmochen's entire force rushed into the city, capturing Shi Gui alive before killing him. He also captured the generals, Wang Bohe (王伯和) and Cheng Ci'an (成次安), who were sent by Houmochen Yue with 2,000 troops to reinforce Shi Gui.

With Shi Gui dead, Houmochen was then appointed the new Inspector of Yuan province. He then followed Yuwen Tai to defeat Houmochen Yue later that year, and he was promoted to General Who Attacks the West. He was later sent to pacify Qin province, after which he was enfeoffed the Count of Guangwu County.

== Service under Western Wei ==
In 534, following Emperor Xiaowu's flight to Chang'an, the Northern Wei was split into two, with Yuwen Tai leading the Western Wei and Gao Huan leading the Eastern Wei. In 535, Houmochen Chong was appointed Inspector of Jing province, Regular Mounted Attendant and Grand Chief Controller, while his fiefly title was elevated to Duke. He was later promoted to Grand General of Chariots and Cavalry as well as Minister of Palace with equal ceremonials and rank to the Three Excellencies and granted the new title of Duke of Pengcheng Commandery.

In 537, Houmochen Chong followed Yuwen Tai in the Battle of Xiaoguan, during which they captured the Eastern Wei general, Dou Tai. Later that year, Houmochen assisted in the capture of Hongnong Commandery and partook in the Battle of Shayuan, after which the number of households under his peerage was increased as a reward. In 538, Houmochen Chong also participated in the Battle of Heqiao. Though the Western Wei suffered a defeat, Houmochen made the most achievements in this battle.

In 541, the Jihu people rebelled and Houmochen led his soldiers to suppress them. Afterwards, he was appointed Inspector of Yong province while concurrently serving as Supervisor of the Household of the Crown Prince. The campaign against the Jihu was Houmochen's last known military activity, but in 549, he was made into a Zhuguo and appointed as the Junior Tutor. In 554, he was appointed Inspector of Ning province and Prefect of the Masters of Writing. When the Six Titled Retainers was established in 556, Houmochen was made the Grand Minister of Works.

== Service under Northern Zhou and death ==
Yuwen Tai died in 556 and was succeeded by his nephew, Yuwen Hu. In 557, Yuwen Hu forced Emperor Gong of Western Wei to abdicate the throne to Yuwen Tai's son, Yuwen Jue, posthumously known as Emperor Xiaomin, and established the Northern Zhou. Houmochen's peerage was raised to Duke of Liang, and he was further given the office of Grand Protector. He then served successively as Minister of Rites in 558 and Grand Minister Over the Masses in 559.

In 563, Houmochen was accompanying Emperor Wu of Northern Zhou on an inspection tour of Yuan province. The emperor returned to the capital at night, which surprised many people in private. Houmochen told his friend, Chang Sheng (常升), "I heard from a fortune teller that the Duke of Jin (Yuwen Hu) will be having bad luck this year. The fact that the imperial carriage suddenly returned at night would mean that the Duke of Jin is dead." However, Houmochen's words began to circulate among the people that it was eventually reported to the court. Emperor Wu summoned his minister at the Dade Hall (大德殿) and blamed Houmochen for starting the rumour. Houmochen was terrified and apologized, but later that night Yuwen Hu sent his men to surround his residence and forced him to commit suicide.

Houmochen was still buried according to the usual rites, but he was initially given the negative posthumous name of "Zhao" (躁; meaning "Impetuous"). After Yuwen Hu was killed by Emperor Wu in 572, his posthumous name was changed to the more dignified "Zhuangmin" (莊閔; meaning "Solemnly Careful").

== Anecdote ==
=== Humiliating Wang Yong ===
Wang Yong was a fierce and brave Northern Zhou general. He often boasted about his achievements while also publicly belittling others for their shortcomings, and so many people despised him. Houmochen was already a high-ranking and respected official at the time. During a visit to Yuwen Hu with the other generals, Houmochen learnt of Wang Yong's irksome behaviour, so he had Wang humilitiated in public. Wang was so angry and ashamed that it aggravated the carbuncle on his back, causing him to die shortly after.

== Sources ==
- Book of Zhou
- History of the Northern Dynasties
- Zizhi Tongjian
