= Heba Yue =

Northern Wei general (died 534)

- 賀拔岳

Grand Chief Controller (大都督)
- In office 533–534
- Monarch: Emperor Xiaowu of Northern Wei

Personal details
- Born: Unknown Shouyang County, Shanxi
- Died: February or March 534 Zhongning County, Ningxia
- Relations: Heba Yun (brother); Heba Sheng (brother)
- Children: Heba Zhonghua; Heba Wei
- Parent: Heba Duba (father)
- Xianbei name: Adouni (阿斗泥)
- Peerage: Duke of Qingshui Commandery (清水郡公)
- Posthumous name: Wuzhuang (武莊)

Heba Yue (died February or March 534), Xianbei nickname Adouni, was a Tiele military general of the Northern Wei dynasty during the Northern and Southern dynasties. During the rebellion of the Six Garrisons, he joined the Wei commander, Erzhu Rong and followed Erzhu Tianguang in his campaign to pacify the Guanzhong region. After the Erzhu clan's defeat in 532, he seized control over the Guanzhong and later colluded with Emperor Xiaowu of Northern Wei to wrest power away from Gao Huan, who held paramountcy over the imperial court. In 534, through Gao Huan's instigation, Heba was assassinated by his trusted friend, Houmochen Yue.

Modern historian, Chen Yinke accredit the founding of the Guanlong Group to Heba Yue. After his death, his subordinate, Yuwen Tai assumed leadership over the group and founded the Western Wei, which was later succeeded by the Northern Zhou, Sui and Tang dynasties, all of which were politically dominated by the group.

== Background and early career ==
Heba Yue was an ethnic Tiele whose family lived in Jianshan County (尖山縣), Shenwu Commandery (神武郡; in present-day Shenchi County, Shanxi), and his father was Heba Duba (賀拔度拔), the commander of Wuchuan garrison under the Northern Wei. He studied in the Imperial Academy when he was young, and after reaching adulthood, he was able to use the bow with either one of his hands. He was described as courageous, having great ambitions and drawn to befriending the heroes of his time. Although Heba did not read the Art of War, his tactics were said to be in accordance with the book's teaching, which amazed the people who knew him.

In 523, when the Six Garrisons broke out in rebellion, Heba Yue followed his father to reinforce Yang Jun (楊鈞), the commander of the Huaishuo garrison (懷朔鎮; northeast of Guyang County, Inner Mongolia). At the time, the rebel general, Wei Kegu (衛可孤) was overlooking the battle from the west, more than 300 steps away from the city. Heba Yue spotted Wei Kegu and shot his arm with an arrow from the city wall, shocking the rebel army. In 524, Wei Kegu captured Huaishuo along with Heba Duba and Heba Yue. However, the Heba family remained loyal to Northern Wei, so they secretly conspired with the other captives (including the father of Yuwen Tai, Yuwen Gong (宇文肱)) and killed Wei Kegu in an ambush. Later, Heba Yue was promoted to the office of General of the Strong Crossbow, and along with his brother Heba Sheng, he was assigned to guard Heng province (恆州; roughly present-day Datong, Shanxi).

== Service under Erzhu Rong ==
In 526, Heng province was overran by rebels under Xianyu Ahu (鮮于阿胡) from Shuo province, so Heba Yue decided to join the Wei commander, Erzhu Rong, who made him a general. Soon, he was appointed as a Chief Controller. Erzhu Rong held Heba Yue in high regard, as their ideas were often consistent with each other.

By then, Erzhu Rong had gathered a larger army and wanted to support the imperial court. He told Heba, "Now the Empress Dowager (Empress Dowager Hu) reigns, and her cronies run the government. The bandits are rising in droves, and the realm is in chaos. Time and time again, the imperial army has been dispatched only to be defeated one after another. My family have received the state's grace for generations and shared both joy and sorrow. I wish to personally lead my troops and horses into the capital, cleanse the emperor's entourage and eliminate the rebellions from the outside. What is the plan for the path of victory?" Heba responded, "To accomplish the extraordinary, one must make use of extraordinary men. General, your troops and horses are elite, and your status is high. If you raise the banner of justice, subjugate the rebels and uphold our lord, then wherever we go we will conquer, and whoever we face we will vanquish. As the ancients said, "Morning plans cannot be done in the evening, and words cannot be spoken when the emperor arrives." This was what they meant." Impressed by his response, Erzhu Rong exclaimed, "Your words show the ambitions of a true man!"

In 528, Emperor Xiaoming was secretly assassinated by Empress Dowager Hu, but Erzhu Rong found his death suspicious and led his army to Luoyang with Heba Yue commanding the vanguard. Near Luoyang, Erzhu Rong carried out the infamous Heyin Incident and killed the Empress Dowager along with 2,000 court officials. One of Erzhu's generals, Gao Huan urged him to become emperor, but Heba Yue believed that it was still too early as there were still rebel forces that needed to be defeated. Erzhu sided with Heba and installed a member of the imperial family, Yuan Ziyou (posthumously Emperor Xiaozhuang) to the throne. Heba also urged Erzhu to execute Gao Huan for suggesting outright treason, but many of Erzhu's generals came to his defence, and Heba was ignored.

For his strategic contributions, Heba Yue was promoted to General of the Front and Palace Counsellor. He was also bestowed the title of Baron of Fancheng. Not long after the Heyin Incident, he was appointed Chief Controller of the Front Army and partook in the decisive victory over the rebel, Ge Rong at Fukou (滏口; northwest of present-day Ci County, Hebei), for which he was awarded the office of General Who Pacifies the East and Grand Master of the Palace with Golden Seal and Purple Ribbon. He was dismissed for an unspecified crime, but soon reinstated through an imperial decree. In 529, he followed Erzhu Rong to recapture Luoyang from Yuan Hao and Chen Qingzhi, and he was promoted to Left Household Counsellor and General of the Military Guards.

== Pacifying the Guanzhong ==
=== Deferring command to Erzhu Tianguang ===
Previously in 528, one of the major rebels, Moqi Chounu proclaimed himself emperor in the Guanzhong region, which worried the imperial court. In 530, Erzhu Rong commissioned for Heba Yue to pacify the region. However, during a private meeting with Heba Sheng, he expressed concern that failing his duty would have him convicted, but succeeding would also draw suspicion from Erzhu Rong, especially with Gao Huan close by to spread accusations. Heba Sheng agreed and suggested to Erzhu Rong that he give the commanding role to a relative while relegating his brother to a deputy. Erzhu Rong was pleased by Heba's deferral and appointed his cousin, Erzhu Tianguang to lead the campaign. Heba Yue served as Erzhu Tianguang's Left Chief Controller, while his close friend, Houmochen Yue served as the Right Chief Controller.

Early in the campaign, the roads at Chishui (赤水; in present-day Weinan, Shaanxi) were blocked by bandits from the Shu region. Erzhu Tianguang only had less than 2,000 troops with him and was reluctant to advance. Heba Yue encouraged him to fight, but Tianguang refused and entrusted Heba with clearing out the bandits. Heba advanced and routed the bandits north of the Wei River, acquiring 2,000 war horses and increasing the prestige of their army.

=== Capturing Yuchi Pusa ===
In March or April 530, Moqi Chounu led his army to invade Qi province and ordered his generals, Yuchi Pusa (尉遲菩薩) and Moqi Wu (万俟仵), to cross the Wei River from Wugong to attack the Northern Wei camp. Heba Yue went to provide reinforcements for the camp, but by the time he arrived, Yuchi had captured it and returned to Qi. Instead, Heba led 800 cavalries, including Yuwen Tai, Li Hu, Houmochen Chong, Zhao Gui, Yu Jin, Kou Luo, Wang Xiong, Helian Da, Daxi Wu and Ruogan Hui, to cross north of the Wei River to attack Moqi's officials and people. Yuchi was provoked and brought 20,000 troops to pursue Heba to the north bank of the Wei River.

Along the river, Heba personally led a few dozen cavalries across to speak with Yuchi and win him over. However, Yuchi only sent a messenger to respond to him, which angered Heba who shot the messenger to death with arrows. The following day, Heba returned with more than a hundred troops to speak with Yuchi again, but this time, he gradually moved and led the rebel army eastward. Once they reached a shallow part of the river where they could wade through, Heba's forces suddenly bolted away to the east. Yuchi thought that Heba was escaping, so he abandoned his infantry and only brought his light cavalry across the river to chase after him.

Prior to their meeting, Heba had hid his other cavalrymen along a ridge for an ambush. Once half of the enemy soldiers crossed the river, Heba turned back with his entire force and rushed down the ridge, routing the enemy. He then announced to the rebels that he would spare any one of them who dismount from their horse. In the end, Yuchi Pusa was captured alive along with 3,000 cavalrymen. Heba then crossed the Wei River again and captured a further 10,000 soldiers as well as their baggage.

=== Defeat of Moqi Chounu ===
When Moqi Chounu received news of Yuchi's defeat, he abandoned Qi province and fled north to Anding in Jing province, allowing Erzhu Tianguang to march from Yong province to occupy Qi. In April or May, Erzhu's forces arrived at the confluence of the Qian and Wei rivers (汧渭; in present-day Baoji, Shaanxi). Heba began spreading a false rumour that the Wei army will attack in the autumn, as the summer was too hot. The rumour reached Moqi, who believed it and disbanded his army, forcing his people to farm along the Xi River (細川; between the areas of Jingchuan and Lingtai in Gansu) to the north of Qi province. He also instructed his general, Hou Yuanjin (侯元進) to lead 5,000 soldiers and set up camp in several different strategic locations. With the rebel army dispersed, Heba then led his soldiers to attack.

At dawn, the Wei forces broke through Hou Yuanjin's camp, capturing him and his followers alive but soon releasing them. When the other rebels heard that Heba had spared Hou and his soldiers, many of them surrendered their forts one after another. Heba then marched day and night before reaching Anding, where provincial inspector under Moqi, Qiji Changgui (俟幾長貴), surrendered the region. Moqi attempted to flee to Gaoping, but Heba pursued him with his light cavalry and caught up with him at Changkeng (長坑; in present-day Pingliang, Gansu), where Houmochen Chong captured him alive. Heba's forces also defeated Moqi Daoluo (万俟道洛) at Mount Qiantun (牽屯山, in modern Guyuan, Ningxia).

Daoluo was able to flee and join the bandit leader of Lüeyang, Wang Qingyun (王慶雲), but in July or August, Heba and Erzhu Tianguang marched to Shuiluo City (水洛,; in modern Pingliang, Gansu) and captured the two men, killing 17,000 of their surrendered soldiers. With the defeat of Moqi Chounu, the Three Qins and the provinces of He, Gua, Liang and Shan all submitted to the imperial court. Heba was promoted to General of Chariots and Cavalry and enfeoffed the Count of Fancheng County. He was soon elevated to Chief Controller of military affairs in the Four Provinces of Jing, Northern Bin and the Two Xias as well as the Duke of Fancheng County.

== Guarding the Guanzhong ==
In October or November, the surrendered general, Suqin Mingda, rebelled again and fled to Eastern Xia province (東夏州; roughly around Baotou, Inner Mongolia). Heba Yue chased after him, but he soon received news from Luoyang that Erzhu Rong was assassinated by Emperor Xiaozhuang, so he let Suqin escape and returned to Jing province. He, Erzhu Tianguang and Houmochen Yue then went south to Long province (隴州; in modern Baoji, Shaanxi), where they discussed about marching to Luoyang.

When Erzhu Tianguang left for Luoyang, he assigned Heba as the acting Inspector of Yong province. As the Erzhu clan propped up Yuan Ye and then Yuan Gong in challenge of Xiaozhuang for the throne, Heba received a series of promotions, including privilege of a Separate Office with equal ceremonial to the Three Excellencies and his peerage being elevated to the Duke of Qingshui Commandery. By 532, he held the office of Chief Controller of military affairs in the Three Yongs, Three Qins, Two Qis and Two Huas, as well as the Inspector of Yong province.

In March or April 532, Erzhu Tianguang contemplated sending troops to attack Gao Huan, who had rebelled against the Erzhu clan in the east at Xindu. Heba attempted to dissuade him, believing he should instead defend the Guanzhong in light of infighting within the Erzhu clan. However, Tianguang ignored him and went ahead, leaving behind his son, Erzhu Xianshou (爾朱顯壽), to guard the key city of Chang’an. Fearing that Tianguang would not return victorious, Heba responded to Gao Huan's call to arms and colluded with Houmochen Yue in capturing Erzhu Xianshou. As Heba had feared, the Erzhu clan was defeated by Gao Huan at Hanling, and Tianguang was captured and executed while fleeing to Luoyang.

== Conflict with Gao Huan and death ==
=== Forming the Guanlong Group ===
Gao Huan, now the paramount general of the empire, installed another member of the imperial family, Yuan Xiu to the throne, posthumously known as Emperor Xiaowu of Northern Wei. Relations were strained between the new emperor and Gao Huan, as both sides sought to assert their dominance over the government. Meanwhile, Heba Yue retained control over a significant portion over the Guanzhong, becoming Grand Branch Censorate of the region shortly after Xiaowu's ascension. Seeing Heba's influence in the west, in 533, the new emperor thus issued a secret order for him to eliminate Gao Huan, pricking his own flesh before his heart and sending his blood to him. Along with the office of Grand Chief Controller, Heba was also made the Chief Controller of military affairs in provinces of the Two Yongs, Two Huas, Two Qis, Bin, Four Liangs, Three Yis, Ba, Two Xias, Wei, Ning, and Jing.

Accepting his order, Heba travelled to the northern border to organize his defences. He also set up camps dozens of miles west of Pingliang, ostensibly to have his horses graze in Yuan province (原州; roughly in modern Guyuan, Ningxia), but actually to better defend himself. Many of the local leaders such as Moqi Luo and Hedouling Yili (紇豆陵伊利) submitted to him, while the provincial inspectos of Qin, Southern Qin, He and Wei converged at Pingliang, where they affirmed their willingness to follow Heba's orders. Among the major governors in the west, only the Inspector of Ling province, Cao Ni (曹泥), refused to follow Heba and supported Gao Huan.

=== Hequ Incident and death ===
Gao Huan had long been wary of Heba Yue and his brothers as they were not fully under his control. He dispatched his official, Zhai Song (翟嵩) to sow discord between Heba Yue and Houmochen Yue, who was serving as the Inspector of Qin province. Houmochen was successfully enticed into siding with Gao Huan while Heba was kept unaware, continuing to value his close relationship with Houmochen through long conversations and banquets.

In February or March 534, Heba Yue planned a northward campaign against Cao Ni with Houmochen serving as his vanguard in spite of warnings from Yuwen Tai regarding his trustworthiness. Heba ordered Houmochen to proceed ahead first, but the next day at dawn, he appeared at Heba's camp at Hequ instead and invited him over to his tent to discuss military affairs. Heba obliged, but during their discussions, Houmochen pretended to suffer from a stomach ache and got up from his seat. Distracted, Houmochen's son-in-law, Yuan Hongjing (元洪景) then assassinated Heba in the tent.

Heba Yue's death sent shock waves among his followers, but they soon rallied around Yuwen Tai and killed Houmochen Yue in the end. Zhao Gui managed to retrieve his body from Houmochen and provided him a burial with royal rites at Shi'an Plains (石安原; northeast of present-day Xianyang, Shaanxi). The imperial court was devastated by his death and posthumously awarded him the offices of Palace Attendant, Grand Tutor, Manager of the Affairs of the Masters of Writing, Chief Controller of military affairs in twenty provinces of the Guanzhong, General-in-Chief and Inspector of Yong province. He was also given the posthumous name of "Wuzhuang".

Heba Yue had two sons, Heba Zhonghua (賀拔仲華) and Heba Wei (賀拔緯), while his brother Heba Sheng became a prominent general of the Western Wei. Despite Heba Yue's influence, Yuwen Tai would effectively succeed him as leader of the Guanlong group, while his family were willing to accept subordinate roles under the Western Wei and then the Northern Zhou.

== Sources ==
- Book of Zhou
- History of the Northern Dynasties
- Zizhi Tongjian
