= Zhao Gui =

Western Wei and Northern Zhou general (died 557)

- 趙貴

Grand Tutor (太傅)
- In office 557–557
- Monarch: Emperor Xiaomin

Personal details
- Born: Unknown Wuchuan County, Inner Mongolia
- Died: 2 April 557 Xi'an, Shaanxi
- Relations: Zhao Da (great-grandfather); Zhao Ren (grandfather)
- Courtesy name: Yuangui (元貴); Yuanbao (元寶)
- Xianbei name: Yifu Gui (乙弗貴)
- Peerage: Duke of Chu (楚國公)

Zhao Gui (died 2 April 557), courtesy name Yuangui or Yuanbao, Xianbei name Yifu Gui, was a military general of the Northern Wei, Western Wei and Northern Zhou during the Northern and Southern dynasties period. He was a key supporter of Yuwen Tai, recommending him to become Heba Yue's successor in leading the generals of Guanzhong. Under the Western Wei, he partook in several battles against the Eastern Wei, and despite his mixed record on the battlefield, he was eventually made into one of the Eight Zhuguo (八柱國). After the establishment of the Northern Zhou, Zhao Gui came into conflict with the regent, Yuwen Hu and conspired with Dugu Xin to kill him, but was caught and executed.

== Early life and career ==
Zhao Gui's family were originally from Nan'an County (南安; southeast of present-day Longxi County, Gansu), Tianshui Commandery. His great-grandfather, Zhao Da (趙達) was a Master of Writing for the Chief of Treasury under the Northern Wei and was given the fiefly title of Viscount of Linjin. His grandfather, Zhao Ren (趙仁), was stationed at the frontier garrison of Wuchuan, where he and his family settled down.

In his youth, Zhao Gui was described as young and prudent. When rebellions broke out in the north in 525, he led his family people south to flee the chaos, but he was captured by the rebel leader, Ge Rong at Zhongshan. Zhao remained a captive until Ge Rong's defeat in 528, after which he was made a general by the Wei commander, Erzhu Rong. The following year, he followed Erzhu in his campaign against Yuan Hao and Chen Qingzhi, making great contributions that earned him the fiefly title of Viscount of Yanle County and the offices of General Who Calms the Waves and General of the Household Rapid as Tigers. In 530, Zhao Gui was a subordinate of Heba Yue during Erzhu Tianguang's expedition to pacify the Guanzhong region. Following the campaign's success, Zhao's peerage was elevated to Count of Weiping County. He was successively promoted to General Who Guards the North, Household Counsellor and Chief Controller.

== Service under Yuwen Tai ==
=== Hequ Incident and recommending Yuwen Tai ===
For the next five years, Zhao Gui remained under the command of Heba Yue, who later allied himself with Emperor Xiaowu of Northern Wei to overthrow the paramount general, Gao Huan. In 534, Heba Yue, having unified most of the Guanzhong region, wanted to campaign against the Inspector of Ling province, Cao Ni (曹泥) who remained loyal to Gao Huan. He sent Zhao Gui to meet the Inspector of Xia province, Yuwen Tai to enquire his opinion on the campaign, but as Zhao met with Yuwen, Heba was assassinated by the Inspector of Qin province, Houmochen Yue.

Many of Heba's subordinates scattered, unwilling the submit to Houmochen. Zhao Gui mournfully told his friends, "I have heard that benevolence and righteousness are not forever. Those who practice them are men of honour, while those who violate them are villains. Zhu Bohou and Wang Shuzhi, out of gratitude for a small favour, were able to uphold their integrity; how much more so are we, having been honoured by Duke Heba as outstanding officials? Would you rather be like the rest?"

Soon, fifty men followed Zhao Gui to feign surrender to Houmochen. Using generous words, Zhao was able to impress Houmochen into allowing him to provide Heba a proper burial. Once retrieving the body, Zhao, Kou Lou and others gathered their forces and fled to Pingliang, where they plotted to defeat Houmochen. When discussing on who should lead them, Zhao was the first to propose Heba's subordinate, the Inspector of Xia province, Yuwen Tai. The generals agreed, and after Yuwen arrived, Zhao was appointed as Grand Chief Controller while concurrently serving as Consulate Marshal.

=== Division of Northern Wei ===
After Houmochen was defeated that same year, Zhao Gui, in his original military capacity, took over government affairs in Qin province as Grand Chief Controller of the region. He governed the province cleanly and peacefully, earning the respect of the officials and people. In October or November 534, Gao Huan launched an attack on Luoyang against Emperor Xiaowu of Wei and dispatched his general, Han Gui to camp at Puban (蒲阪, in modern Yuncheng, Shanxi). Yuwen Tai sent Zhao along with Liang Yu (梁御) and others to attack Puban, but before they could cross the Yellow River, Emperor Xiaowu had left Luoyang and reached Hangu Pass, intending to join Yuwen Tai at Chang'an. With Emperor Xiaowu at Chang'an, Yuwen Tai became paramount general of the Western Wei, while Gao Huan led the Eastern Wei. The emperor appointed Zhao Gui as General of Chariots and Cavalry and Minister of Palace with Equal Ceremonials to the Three Excellencies while concurrently holding the office of Right General of the Guards.

=== Campaigns against Cao Ni and Liang Xianding ===
With Cao Ni continuing to resist Yuwen Tai, Zhao Gui was assigned as Grand Chief Controller to lead Li Bi and others in suppressing the rebellion. Zhao was elevated to a Marquis, and then in 535, to a Duke after he assisted in the enthronement of Yuan Baoju, posthumously known as Emperor Wen of Western Wei. He was also appointed as Inspector of Qi province, but due to mounting military and national affairs, Yuwen retained Zhao Gui by his side for his expertise, so he did not take up his post in Qi. Still, he served as Left Chief Clerk of the Prime Minister and appointed as a Regular Mounted Attendant. Also in 535, the King of Dangchang, Liang Xianding rebelled near the Hexi region. The Western Wei court appointed Zhao Gui and Branch Censorate of the Longxi, ordering him to repel the invasion. Together with Houmochen Shun (侯莫陳順) and others, Zhao defeated Liang Xianding.

=== Battles with the Eastern Wei ===
In 537, Zhao Gui followed Yuwen Tai to occupy Hongnong Commandery and partook in the Battle of Shayuan. At Shayuan, Yuwen Tai laid an ambush for the numerically superior Eastern Wei army. Zhao Gui led the left wing, and during the ambush, the Eastern Wei concentrated their forces in attacking him. Fortunately for him, Li Bi led his cavalry units to charge into the battle lines and split the Eastern Wei forces into two. The battle was a resounding victory for the Western Wei, and Zhao was appointed as Palace Attendant, Grand General of Agile Cavalry, Minister of Palace with Equal Rank to the Three Excellencies and Inspector of Yong province. His peerage was also elevated to Duke of Zhongshan Commandery.

In 538, Zhao Gui accompanied Yuwen Tai to fight in the Battle of Heqiao, once more commanding the left wing. However, the situation for the Western Wei gradually turned worse for them as they continued to fight, and they were unable to locate Yuwen on the battlefield. Zhao Gui, along with his fellow vanguard generals, Dugu Xin, Li Yuan and Yi Feng, all decided to retreat first, prompting the rear to also withdraw. As a result, the Western Wei was defeated in battle.

In 542, as Gao Huan laid siege to Yubi (玉壁, in modern Yuncheng, Shanxi), Zhao Gui followed Yuwen Tai to reinforce the city, forcing Gao to withdraw in the end. In 543, the Eastern Wei Inspector of Northern Yu province, Gao Zhongmi rebelled which led to the Battle of Mount Mang. Zhao Gui led the left wing again, but lost command over his troops, causing the rest of the Western Wei army to collapse. Zhao Gui was dismissed from the government for the defeat at Mount Mang, although he was given the titles of General of Agile Cavalry and Grand Chief Controller to continue commanding his army.

=== Reinstatement and Zhuguo ===
In 549, Zhao Gui was reinstated as the Lieutenant of the Imperial Censor and a rank of general. That year, the Eastern Wei generals, Gao Yue and Murong Shaozong laid siege to the Western Wei commander, Wang Sizheng at Yingchuan. Zhao Gui led the troops from the southeastern regions to support Wang, but the Eastern Wei forces had blocked the Wei river to flood Yingchuan, preventing reinforcements from arriving. Wang's army was defeated, and Zhao Gui was forced to retreat. Soon, Zhao was made a Zhuguo and given the Xianbei family name of "Yifu". When the Rouran invaded Guangwu Commandery (廣武郡; around present-day Yongdeng County, Gansu) that same year, Zhao Gui defeated them, killing thousands, seizing their military supplies and reorganizing his army before returning triumphantly.

== Death ==
In 556, when the Six Titled Retainers was established, Zhao Gui was appointed Grand Protector and Minister of Rites. His peerage was also changed to the Duke of Nanyang Commandery. That year, Yuwen Tai died, and his nephew, Yuwen Hu succeeded him as regent. In 557, Yuwen Hu forced Emperor Gong of Western Wei to abdicate the throne to Yuwen Tai's son, Yuwen Jue, posthumously known as Emperor Xiaomin of Northern Zhou. Zhao Gui was promoted to the Grand Tutor and Minister of Palace Affairs, while his peerage was elevated to the Duke of Chu.

However, Zhao Gui grew disgruntled with Yuwen Hu's control over the imperial government. When Yuwen Tai was alive, he and Dugu Xin were both Yuwen's equals, and he also considered himself an accomplished official. He conspired with Dugu to kill Yuwen Hu, but when the time came and Zhao was about to carry out his assassination, Dugu stopped him. Eventually, they were reported to the court by the chief minister, Yuwen Sheng, and Dugu was forced to commit suicide while Zhao was executed.

== Sources ==
- Book of Zhou
- History of the Northern Dynasties
- Zizhi Tongjian
