= Li Hu (general) =

Li Hu (Chinese: 李虎; died 551 or 554), courtesy name Wenbin (文彬), Xianbei name Daye Hu (大野虎), was a Chinese general and official of the Northern Wei and Western Wei dynasties.As one of the state's most distinguished generals, he became one of the Eight Zhuguo (八柱國) in 548. He was the grandfather of Li Yuan, the founding emperor of the Tang dynasty, during which he was honored with the temple name of Emperor Taizu (太祖皇帝).

== Background ==
Official histories about Li Hu's era such as Book of Wei, Book of Zhou, and History of the Northern Dynasties have no biographies about him, as these histories were all written during the Tang dynasty, which honored him as an emperor, meaning that he was not included in the biographies section, which was reserved for officials, princes, and other figures. Much information about Li Hu comes from histories composed in later dynasties such as Cefu Yuangui, Zizhi Tongjian, and Book of Western Wei.

According to Old Book of Tang, Li Hu was a fifth-generation descendant of Li Gao, founder of the Western Liang dynasty through his son Li Xin. Li Hu was the second of three sons of Li Tianxi (李天錫), who was an officer serving Northern Wei.

Li Hu initially served under Northern Wei general Heba Yue and participated in the defeat of Yuan Hao, a Northern Wei pretender backed by Southern Liang in 529. For his efforts, Li Hu was made the Viscount of Jinshou County (晉壽縣子). Later, he followed Heba Yue in defeating Xiongnu rebel leader Moqi Chounu in Longxi. After Heba Yue was murdered by fellow general Houmochen Yue in 534, his subordinates offered the command to Yuwen Tai. Li Hu, however, opted to go to general Heba Sheng, Heba Yue's elder brother, and offered him the command instead. Heba Sheng refused, and Li Hu returned to Yuwen Tai and submitted to his command. At this point, he became the Inspector of Ling Prefecture (靈州刺史).

In 537, Li Hu participated in the Battle of Shayuan against Gao Huan's forces. After years of suppressing rebellions, Li Hu gained the title of Duke of Longxi Commandery (隴西郡公).

According to Zizhi Tongjian, Li Hu died in June or July of 551, while the Book of Western Wei (西魏書) asserts that he died in June or July of 554.

== Genetics ==
In 2021, two tombs belonging to an elite nuclear family of three were discovered in Shaanxi Province. One tomb belonged to the father and mother while the son occupied a separate tomb. The epitaph in front of the parents' tomb entrance states that its occupants are Bulugu Liang, a governor in the Northern Zhou dynasty, and his wife with the surname Daye, the daughter of the Duke of Longxi (Li Hu) in the Western Wei dynasty. Daye was an adult, her husband around 30 years old, and their son about 18-19 years old at the time of death. A genetic study on the three individuals was published in 2025 showing that the family was predominantly East Asian, related to northern Chinese farmers, with minor Eurasian Steppe pastoralist ancestry. Autosomal analysis shows that both Bulugu and Daye were primarily related to agricultural populations in northern China at 95.8%–97.3% with minor genetic admixture from Eurasian Steppe pastoralists at 2.7%–4.2%. Both Bulugu and Daye's genetic profiles shares ~ 95% ancestry with Gao Bin, a confirmed Han aristocrat in the same dynasty, and ~ 5% Western Steppe ancestry. Their mitochondrial haplogroups, B4b1a3a and M8 respectively, are commonly found in Han and Tibeto-Burman populations. Bulugu has haplogroups O2a2b1a2a and B4b1a3a. Haplogroup O2a2b1a2a is a downstream sub-clade of O-M134, one of the most common paternal lineages among Han Chinese and other East Asian populations. Based on these results, the authors suggest that it is likely that these individuals were Han aristocrats who were given Xianbei names as part of the historical policy in Northern Zhou rather than belonging to an ethnic Xianbei lineage.

== Family ==
Father:

- Li Tianxi (李天錫)

Mother:

- Lady Jia (賈)

Children:

- Li Yanbo (李延伯), posthumously honored as Duke of Nanyang (南陽公).
- Li Zhen (李真), posthumously honored as Prince of Qiao (譙王).
- Li Bing (李昞), father of Li Yuan, the founding emperor of Tang dynasty.
- Li Zhang (李璋), posthumously honored as Prince of Bi (畢王).
- Li Hui (李繪), posthumously honored as Prince of Yong (雍王).
- Li Yi (李禕), posthumously honored as Prince of Xun (郇王). Ancestor of Chancellor Li Linfu.
- Li Wei (李蔚), posthumously honored as Prince Lie of Cai (蔡烈王).
- Li Liang (李亮), posthumously honored as Prince Xiao of Zheng (鄭孝王).
- At least 3 daughters.
