= Wang Sizheng =

Western Wei general

- 王思政

Grand General
- In office 548–549
- Monarch: Emperor Wen of Western Wei

Personal details
- Born: Unknown Qi County, Shanxi
- Died: After 550
- Children: Wang Yuanxun; Wang Kan; Wang Kui; Wang Han; Wang Gong; Wang Xi; Lady Wang
- Parent: Wang You (father)
- Courtesy name: Sizheng (思政)
- Peerage: Duke of Taiyuan Commandery (太原郡公)

Wang Sizheng (fl. 520–550), courtesy name Sizheng, was a military general of the Northern Wei and Western Wei during the Northern and Southern dynasties period. He was one of Emperor Xiaowu of Northern Wei's close associates who persuaded him to join Yuwen Tai in moving the capital west to the Guanzhong region. As a general of Western Wei, he built the city of Yubi (玉壁, in modern Yuncheng, Shanxi), which became an important garrison of defense against the Eastern Wei. In 547, when the Eastern Wei general, Hou Jing, rebelled in the Henan, he invaded Yingchuan at his own accord and held out in the city of Changshe (長社; in present-day Changge, Henan) for over a year without reinforcements before surrendering.

== Background ==
Wang Sizheng was born into the Wang clan of Qi county, Taiyuan Commandery. Records indicate that he was a descendant of the Eastern Han dynasty minister, Wang Yun, but modern historian, Yao Weiyuan (姚薇元) theorized that he was from a different Wang clan of Wuhuan descent. He was described as tall and good-looking with a mind for strategy. His father, Wang You (王佑), was a provincial registrar.

== Service under Northern Wei ==
During the Zhengguang era (520-525), Wang Sizheng was a Regular Mounted Attendant. Later, when Moqi Chounu, Suqin Mingda and others rebelled in the Guanzhong region, the Prince of Beihai, Yuan Hao was commissioned to suppress them. The prince summoned Wang to serve in his campaign, discussing all military matter with him. Wang Sizheng's reputation soon reached the Prince of Pingyang, Yuan Xiu.

When Yuan Hao returned to Luoyang in 527, Yuan Xiu recruited Wang as his retainer and gave him special treatment. In 532, after Yuan Xiu was enthroned by the paramount general, Gao Huan, Wang was entrusted as a close confidant of Yuan Xiu, posthumously known as Emperor Xiaowu. He was transferred to General Who Pacifies the East and the title of Marquis of Qi County for supporting Xiaowu. In 534, war broke out between Gao Huan and Emperor Xiaowu over control of the government. Believing that Wang Sizheng was capable of handling important matters, the emperor appointed him General of the Central Army and Grand Chief Controller, commanding the imperial guards. Wang advised to the emperor that he should flee to the Guanzhong region, which was controlled by the Inspector of Xia province, Yuwen Tai out of Gao Huan's reach, to which he agreed. After Gao Huan sent his troops into Hebei, Wang Sizheng accompanied Xiaowu to the Guanzhong.

== Early service under Western Wei ==
=== Death of Emperor Xiaowu ===
In the Guanzhong, Emperor Xiaowu and Yuwen Tai founded the Western Wei, challenging Gao Huan and his Eastern Wei. Wang Sizheng was enfeoffed the Duke of Taiyuan. However, in 535, the emperor and Yuwen had a falling out with each other, and Xiaowu, likely under Yuwen's orders, was assassinated after drinking poisoned wine. His cousin, Yuan Baoju, posthumously Emperor Wen of Western Wei, was installed to the throne. Wang was later transferred to General of Cavalry, but though he was still allowed to hold office, he often felt uneasy about his position, combined with the fact that he was not one of Yuwen Tai's original followers.

=== Battle of Heqiao ===
In 537, Wang Sizheng and Dugu Xin were dispatched to occupy Luoyang, and the two guarded the city. The following year, the Western Wei and Eastern Wei faced one another at the Battle of Heqiao. Wang rode into battle with his long spear, killing several of the Eastern Wei soldiers, but he was then encircled with all his followers dying in battle. He was severely injured and fell unconscious. However, Wang was wearing clothes and armour that were worn-out from the many battles he fought. The Eastern Wei soldiers thought that he was a foot soldier and left him alone before withdrawing in the evening.

After the battle, his subordinate, Lei Wu'an (雷五安) was crying and looking for him on the battlefield. Wang happened to regain his conscious, allowing Lei to find him. Lei ripped a part of his clothes and bandaged his wounds before helping him mount his horse and returning to their camp late at night.

=== Construction and defence of Yubi city ===
Later, Yuwen Tai appointed Wang Sizheng as a Palace Attendant and Branch Secretariat of the Eastern Circuits, garrisoned at Hongnong Commandery. During his tenure, Wang found that Yubi was a strategic position and requested to build a city there. He personally planned and oversaw the construction of the city. After the completion of the city, Wang moved his administrative office to Yubu and was appointed Chief Controller of military affairs in the provinces of Fen, Jin and Bing, as well as the Inspector of Bing province.

In 542, Gao Huan led his army from Fen province to attack Western Wei. Wang brought his troops to defend Yubi and seized control of a key route for the Eastern Wei. Gao sent a letter to him, "If you surrender now, all of Bing province will be yours." However, Wang retorted, "Kezhuhun Yuan had already surrendered, so why didn't he get Bing?" Gao then laid siege to Yubi, but after nine days, heavy snow began to fall and many of his soldiers froze to death, prompting him to withdraw. For his defense of Yubi, Wang was appointed General of the Cavalry.

=== Fortifying Hongnong ===
In 543, the Western Wei forces were defeated by Gao Huan at the Battle of Mount Mang. Wang Sizheng was transferred from Yubi to Hongnong to guard the city. When he reached Hongnong, Wang ordered for the gates to be left open, took off his clothes and went to sleep, reassuring the city soldiers that there was nothing to fear. The Eastern Wei general, Liu Fengsheng led his troops to attack Hongnong but retreated out of fear of Wang. Afterwards, Wang ordered his followers to build walls and towers, cultivate the farmlands and store fodder. From then on, Hongnong had the necessary defensive facilities. When he was first transferred from Yubi, he recommended a junior general, Wei Xiaokuan to take up his position. Later in 546, Wei made use of Yubi's defense to repel a major invasion led by Gao Huan.

== Battle of Yingchuan ==
=== Invasion of Yingchuan ===
In 546, Wang Sizheng was given the honorific title of Specially Advanced and promoted to Deputy Minister of the Left, Brach Secretariat of the Henan Circuits, Chief Controller and Inspector of Jing province. In 547, the Eastern Wei general, Hou Jing rebelled against his state in the Henan region and requested reinforcements from the Western Wei. The Western Wei court was not trusting of Hou and did not send any soldiers at first. However, Wang Sizheng, believing they should capitalize on the situation, brought 10,000 soldiers from his province, marching from Luyang Pass (魯陽關; southwest of present-day Lushan County, Henan) to Yangdi (陽翟, modern Yuzhou, Henan) without the court's permission. When they heard of Wang's movements, Yuwen Tai had to promote Hou Jing and send another general, Li Bi to reinforce Wang.

In June or July, the Eastern Wei generals, Gao Yue and Han Gui withdrew from fighting Hou Jing when they heard that Western Wei reinforcements had arrived. Wang entered Yingchuan Commandery while Hou Jing moved to Yu province, claiming that he was on the offense but secretly planning to surrender to the Liang dynasty in the south. Wang then sent out his troops to occupy seven provinces and twelve towns owned by Hou Jing. Yuwen Tai granted Wang tally and offered him the positions of Grand Tutor and Grand General while concurrently serving as Prefect of the Masters of Writing, Grand Branch Censorate of the Henan and Chief Controller of military affairs in the Henan, all of which were initially meant for Hou Jing. Wang refused to accept any of these positions, but after Yuwen repeatedly persuaded him, he only accepted the office of Chief Controller, and later, Grand General.

=== Siege of Changshe ===
In 548, the Eastern Wei sent out under a massive army of 100,000 under Gao Yue, Murong Shaozong and Liu Fengsheng to invade Yingchuan. Wang was garrisoned at the city of Changshe, and despite the threat he faced, he was able keep the followers under control. Gao Yue, confident that Yingchuan would fall in a single battle, ordered his forces to surround the city on all sides. Wang selected the strongest soldiers from his force and sallied out. Unable to withstand the attack, Gao led his troops to retreat. Gao then built earthen mounds to overlook the city and used "flying ladders" and "fire chariots" to assault the walls day and night. In response, Wang lit short spears on fire and took advantage of the strong wind to fire them at the mounds and used fire arrows to burn the siege equipment that were on them. He also lowered his soldiers down with ropes outside the city and occupied two of the Eastern Wei's mounds, building battlements on them to help defend the city.

In 549, the paramount general of Eastern Wei, Gao Cheng sent more troops to aid Gao Yue, while Murong Shaozong, Liu Fengsheng and Murong Yongzhen (慕容永珍) built a weir to block the Wei River, intending to flood the city. After the dam was completed, Wang was unable to stop the water from flooding Changshe and its vicinity. The defenders had to cook with hanging pots, and eventually, the food and manpower in the city were exhausted. However, by luck, the tower ship that was carrying Murong Shaozong, Liu Fengsheng and Murong Yongzhen was blown off course by strong wind and ended up in the bottom of Changshe's walls. The defenders used long hooks to tie down the ship and fired arrows at it. Murong Shaozong committed suicide by drowning hile Liu Fengsheng was shot to death while trying to escape to one of the earthen mounds. Murong Yongzhen was captured along with all the equipment on the ship. Wang had Yongzhen beheaded, while the bodies of Shaozong, Fengsheng and others were buried with proper ceremony.

=== Surrendering to Gao Cheng ===
In May or June, Gao Cheng personally led 110,000 soldiers to attack Yingchuan with a specific order to his followers to capture Wang alive. He rushed to the weir, raised his soldiers' morale and opened the water to flood Changshe. The northern wall of Changshe collapse and the whole city was flooded, leaving no place to stand.

No longer able to defend the city, Wang brought his followers to one of the earthen mounds and said to them "I shouldered a heavy responsibility for the state, hoping to overcome the crisis and attain glory, but my sincere devotion was all for nought, and I have disgraced the imperial decree. Now our strength is exhausted and our path is hopeless. I have no other choice; I shall die in gratitude for the emperor's grace." He then looked up to the sky and cried before bowing west and drawing his sword to commit suicide. His followers also cried, but one of them, Luo Xun (駱訓) stopped him and said, "You often tell us that if we surrender our heads, not only will we be rewarded with wealth and honour, but we will also save the lives of an entire city. Now that Prime Minister Gao has offered the chance, should you not feel pity for our soldiers in the city?" The rest of his followers then joined in to stop him from committing suicide, so Wang decided against the decision.

Gao Cheng sent his official, Zhao Yanshen (趙彥深) to the top of the mound to present Wang with a white feather fan and ask for his surrender. Wang agreed, and Zhao brought his down the mound to introduce him to Gao Cheng. Wang spoke with great enthusiasm and regret, but did not act as if he was surrendering. Gao Cheng was convinced by Wang's loyalty to the Western Wei court, so he stood up and saluted him, treating him generously from hereafter.

== Death ==
In 550, Gao Cheng's brother, Gao Yang established the Northern Qi dynasty. Wang was then appointed as Director of the Justice Department of the Imperial Secretariat with equal ceremonial to the Three Excellencies, serving in the Qi court at Ye. He died in an unknown year, and after his death, the court posthumously appointed him the Inspector of Yan province.

== Anecdotes ==
=== Rolling the dice ===
Yuwen Tai once held a grand banquet for his officials at Tong province. During the feast, he took off his golden belt and offered it to anyone who could roll five blacks. None of his officials could get five blacks, but when it was Wang Sizheng's turn, he said "I, Wang Sizheng, returned to the capital after his travels and was treated with such kindness by the Prime Minister (Yuwen Tai). I am willing to serve the state with all my heart and repay the kindness of a confidant. If my intentions are true, then may my first roll be five blacks. But if my heart is impure, then the gods will know and preclude me; in such case, I will sacrifice my life to atone for the favour I received." The guests were all shocked by his proclamation as he drew his sword and placed it across his lap. Wang grabbed the dice and rolled, and before Yuwen Tai could stop him, he had already gotten five blacks. He then kowtowed to Yuwen and accepted the golden belt. From this point on, Yuwen trusted him even more.

=== Disregard for wealth ===
While Wang Sizheg was serving as the Inspector of Jing province, the Chief Controller, Lin Xiaohuan (藺小歡) led craftsmen to repair the city walls and moats, during which they dug up thirty catties of gold. They delivered the gold to Wang at night, but the next morning, Wang ordered his assistant to deliver the gold to the imperial court, stating, "A subject should not have selfish interests."

Wang also refused to engage in business when he was at home. He was once granted a plot of land, and while he was away on a campaign, his family planted mulberry and other trees on it, intending to sell the fruits for profit. When Wang returned, he angrily scolded them, "When the Xiongnu were yet to be destroyed, Huo Qubing had to leave behind his own family. With the great scourge still not quelled, how can one desire to pursue business? How is this putting the interests of the public before our own?" He then had the trees uprooted.

== Sources ==
- Book of Zhou
- Book of Northern Qi
- History of the Northern Dynasties
- Zizhi Tongjian
