= Hongnong =

Hongnong (弘農) may refer to:

- Hongnong Commandery, a commandery of imperial China from Han dynasty to Tang dynasty.
- Yang Wu, also known as Hongnong, a kingdom in 10th-century China.
