= Taiping, Jingchuan County =

Taiping 太平镇
- Town
- Location in Gansu
- Coordinates: 35°16′26″N 107°23′9″E
- Country: People's Republic of China
- Province: Gansu
- Prefecture-level city: Pingliang
- County: Jingchuan County
- Time zone: UTC+8 (China Standard)

Taiping (Chinese: 太平; pinyin: Tàipíng) is a town in Jingchuan County, Gansu province, China. As of 2020, it administers the following 15 villages:

- Sanxing Village (三星村)
- Hongyawan Village (红崖湾村)
- Hejia Village (何家村)
- Zhoujia Village (周家村)
- Zhaiziwa Village (寨子洼村)
- Silangdian Village (四郞殿村)
- Koujia Village (口家村)
- Ya'ao Village (崖窑村)
- Qiqianguan Village (七千关村)
- Huangchang Village (荒场村)
- Pankou Village (盘口村)
- Jiao Village (焦村)
- Zhujiagou Village (朱家沟村)
- Likou Village (里口村)
- Yinpo Village (阴坡村)
