= Guanlong Group =

Group of influential military officials/leaders in China

Guanlong Group also known as the "Guanlong aristocrat"(關隴世族), the "Guanlong gate valve"(關隴門閥), the "Guanlong military aristocrat"(關隴軍事貴族), the "Guanlong Hu and Han group"(關隴胡漢集團) or the "Wuchuan group" (武川集團)."Guanlong Group" is a term coined by Chen Yinke, a prominent Chinese historian, to characterize the familial alliance of several influential families or clans settled in Guanzhong (present-day Shaanxi) and Longxi Commandery (present-day southeastern Gansu). With both Han-people and Xianbei descent, the alliance prospered during Western Wei and Northern Zhou of the Northern dynasty and Sui and Tang dynasties. Its composition blended intellectuals and warriors and its members became emperors, generals, and high officials in the Northern dynasties including Sui and Tang. Their place of origin is Wuchuan.

Chen Yinke once described this group like this: "they studied the best of the barbarians and integrated them into ancient Chinese culture, they abolish the bad and embraced the good, they removed the corrupted, and open up to the new, they expand their influence throughout China and can single-handedly change the political climate of the era." He also used a lot of quotes from the "collection of Yuzi Mountain" "庾子山集", to prove that the Guanlong aristocrats are connected to the Xianbeis and the Hu clan
