= Houmochen Yue =

Military general of the Northern Wei during the Northern and Southern dynasties period

- 侯莫陳悦

Inspector of Qinzhou (秦州刺史)
- In office 531–534
- Monarch: Emperor Jiemin of Northern Wei/Yuan Lang/Emperor Xiaowu of Northern Wei

Personal details
- Born: Unknown Gansu
- Died: April or May 534 Guyuan, Ningxia
- Children: One unnamed son
- Parent: Houmochen Poluomen (father)

Houmochen Yue (died April or May 534) was a military general of the Northern Wei during the Northern and Southern dynasties period. As a subordinate of Erzhu Rong, he followed Erzhu Tianguang in his Guanzhong campaign and was garrisoned in the region alongside his friend, Heba Yue. When conflict arose between Heba Yue and the paramount general, Gao Huan, Houmochen betrayed Heba and assassinated him. However, Heba's generals soon acclaimed Yuwen Tai as their leader, and following a decisive defeat and in the face of imminent capture, Houmochen committed suicide.

== Service under the Erzhu clan ==
Houmochen Yue was born the son of the official, Houmochen Poluomen (侯莫陳婆羅門). His family was originally from Wuchuan County in Dai Commandery, but his father resettled in the Hexi Corridor after he was transferred there as the Camel and Ox Commandant. Growing up in the Hexi, he was fond of hunting and was skilled in archery and horseriding. When the revolt of the Six Garrisons broke out, he surrendered to the Northern Wei commander, Erzhu Rong who recruited him as a military officer before promoting him to the of rank of Grand Chief Controller. In the early years of Emperor Xiaozhuang, Houmochen served as General Who Attacks the West and Grand Master of the Household Counsellors while holding the fiefly title of Marquis of Bairen County.

In 530, Erzhu Rong assigned his cousin, Erzhu Tianguang to lead an expedition against the rebel, Moqi Chounu in the Guanzhong region, with Houmochen serving as his Right Grand Chief Controller. The campaign ended in success, and though records do not describe what they were, Houmochen's achievements were said to be equal to Tianguang and his fellow general, Heba Yue. For his effort, he was appointed as the Inspector of Shan province while retaining his other official positions.

Later that year, Erzhu Rong was assassinated by Emperor Xiaozhuang in the capital, Luoyang. Houmochen accompanied Tianguang to Long province (隴州; in modern Baoji, Shaanxi), and after the Erzhu clan acclaimed Yuan Ye as the new emperor, he was appointed General of Chariots and Cavalry as well as Inspector of Wei province, while his peerage was promoted to the Duke of Baishui Commandery. While Tianguang led his army to Luoyang, Houmochen was appointed as acting Inspector of Hua province. In 531, he was transferred to Inspector of Qin province and granted privilege equal to the Three Excellencies.

In 532, Erzhu Tianguang departed Luoyang to campaign against Gao Huan in the east, leaving behind his brother, Erzhu Xianshou (爾朱顯壽) and Heba Yue to defend the Guanzhong region. Houmochen was summoned by Tianguang to participate in the campaign, but before they could link up, Heba Yue, concerned that the Erzhu clan would fail, sent his lieutenant, Yuwen Tai to persuade him to stay and join forces in overthrowing Erzhu Xianshou at Chang'an. The duo captured the city and later camped at Ling province (靈州, roughly modern Yinchuan, Ningxia) in support of Gao Huan. After the Erzhu clan were decisively defeated at the Battle of Hanling, Heba and Houmochen marched back to Yong province to intercept Erzhu Tianguang and his remaining forces. Houmochen was rewarded by the imperial court with the office of Executor and Assistant Minister of the Three Excellencies and Commander of all military affairs in the Longyou while retaining his position as Inspector of Qin.

== Conflict with Heba Yue and Yuwen Tai ==
=== Hequ Incident ===
The defeat of the Erzhu clan established Gao Huan as the paramount general of the empire, but his control over the Guanzhong region was restricted due to Heba and Houmochen. In 533, he sent his official, Zhai Song (翟嵩) to sow discord between them. Houmochen was enticed into siding with Gao Huan, while Heba remained oblivious to the situation, continuing to treat Houmochen as a friend by holding many banquets and conversations with him.

In February or March 534, Heba Yue made plans for a northward campaign against the Inspector of Ling province, Cao Ni (曹泥), one of the few remaining pro-Gao Huan provincial inspectors in the west. Yuwen Tai attempted to dissuade him out of his plan by asserting that he should prioritise dealing with Houmochen, who posed a more serious threat to Heba. However, Heba, still trusting of Houmochen, disregarded Yuwen's concern and even assigned Houmochen to lead the vanguard for the campaign. Houmochen was ordered to head out first, but he instead marched eastward overnight and arrived at Heba's camp in Hequ the next day at dawn. Heba went to meet Houmochen in front of his army, and he was tricked into entering Houmochen's tent to discuss military matters. At the meeting, Houmochen feigned a stomach ache and stood up to walk slowly. With Heba distracted, Houmochen's son-in-law, Yuan Hongjing (元洪景), then drew his sword and killed him.

After the assassination, Heba Yue's generals panicked and scattered. Houmochen sent his envoys to calm them down and reassure them that he had received orders to only kill Heba and no one else. The generals took his words for it and were ready to obey his orders, but Houmochen hesitated to immediately appease them. He decided to return to Long province and garrisoned his forces at Shuiluo city (水洛, in modern Pingliang, Gansu). He also received a visit from the general, Zhao Gui and granted him permission to give Heba a proper burial.

=== War with Yuwen Tai ===
Heba's remaining subordinates gathered at Pingliang, where they discussed carrying out a counterattack and invited Yuwen Tai to lead their group. Yuwen agreed, and after bringing them over to set camp at Gaoping (高平; in present-day Guyuan, Ningxia), he led them into Long province to attack Houmochen in March or April. Meanwhile, upon hearing of Heba's sudden death, Emperor Xiaowu of Wei summoned Houmochen to Luoyang, but he refused and remained faithful to Gao Huan. Yuwen Tai then sent a letter accusing him of the crime of killing Heba and ordering him to return to Luoyang immediately. Houmochen was apprehensive of Yuwen, so he sent a forged imperial edict to the Inspector of Qin province, Moqi Pubo (万俟普撥) ordering him to join forces. However, Moqi found the edict suspicious and instead sent it to Yuwen.

Houmochen sent his generals, Wang Bohe (王伯和) and Cheng Ci'an (成次安) with 2,000 soldiers to reinforce the Inspector of Yuan province, Shi Gui (史歸). Yuwen Tai dispatched Houmochen Chong with 1,000 light cavalry to attack Shi Gui, capturing him along with Wang, Cheng and others before sending them to Pingliang. One of Houmochen Yue's generals, Li Bi began doubting their chances and urged him to surrender and apologize to Yuwen, but Houmochen panicked at his suggestion and did not know what to do. In April or May, Yuwen, taking advantage of Houmochen's timid and anxious personality, rapidly set out from Pingliang to take him by surprise.

Hearing that Yuwen was approaching, Houmochen retreated to Lüeyang in Qin province and left 10,000 soldiers to defend Shuiluo, but when Yuwen arrived and placed the city under siege, the defenders soon surrendered. Yuwen then sent his light cavalry to attack Houmochen at Lüeyang. Houmochen was frightened and summoned his generals for an emergency meeting, where they suggested that they retreat to Shanggui to evade the enemy. He abandoned Lüeyang and fled south towards Shanggui, occupying the strategic passes in preparation for a decisive battle the following day.

Li Bi, convinced of Houmochen's defeat, warned his peers of the encroaching disaster and encouraged them to submit to Yuwen Tai. He also sent a secret envoy to Yuwen, promising to surrender. That night, Li Bi ordered his men to ride their donkeys and camels, telling people that Houmochen was planning to return to Qin province. As Li Bi was married to Houmochen's aunt and a trusted confidant, many of Houmochen's followers believed him and frantically scattered to make their way to Qin. Li Bi was the first to arrive at the province, where he comforted the defectors. Soon, more people began to fled from Houmochen Yue's side and defected to Yuwen Tai. Yuwen then attacked Houmochen and won a great victory, capturing 10,000 soldiers and 8,000 horses.

=== Death ===
At this point, Houmochen began to suspect his own subordinates of having ulterior motives and made everyone in his camp uneasy. He abandoned his army and fled with his two younger brothers, a son and 8 or 9 subordinates involved in the assassination of Heba Yue. Houmochen wandered around for days, not knowing where to go. His followers wanted to join Cao Ni, but Houmochen was afraid that he would be spotted when leaving Long province. He therefore ordered his followers to walk through the mountains while he rode on a lone mule to escape to Ling province. However, Yuwen Tai knew of his whereabouts and sent Yuwen Dao to intercept him from the front while Heba Ying (賀拔颎) and others pursued him from behind. Upon seeing the pursuing cavalry, Houmochen hanged himself in the fields of Mount Qiantun (牽屯山, in modern Guyuan, Ningxia). Yuwen Dao had him beheaded and sent his head to Luoyang.

Houmochen's brothers, son and subordinates were all killed, the only exception being Dou Luguang (豆盧光), who escaped to Ling province before joining Gao Huan at Jinyang. According to a story in the records, after assassinating Heba Yue, Houmochen became disorientated and was no longer his usual self, often saying, "Whenever I sleep, I dream of Heba Yue asking me "Brother, where are you going?" He follows me and won't leave me alone." He became increasingly anxious, which ultimately contributed to his downfall.

== Sources ==
- Book of Wei
- Book of Zhou
- Zizhi Tongjian
