= Moqi Chounu =

Northern Wei rebel (died 530)

Moqi Chounu (simplified Chinese: 万俟丑奴; traditional Chinese: 万俟醜奴; pinyin: Mòqí Chǒunú; died 530) was a Xianbei rebel of the Northern Wei during the Northern and Southern Dynasties period. He was initially a general of Hu Chen, the rebel leader of Gaoping, who inherited his army after he was killed in 526. As he absorbed the other remaining rebel groups in the Guanzhong region, Moqi proclaimed himself Emperor and declared a new reign era in 528. The Wei paramount general, Erzhu Rong dispatched his cousin Erzhu Tianguang, accompanied by the likes of Heba Yue, Houmochen Yue and Yuwen Tai to pacify the rebellion, and in 530, Moqi was captured and executed.

== Life ==
Moqi Chounu was a native of Gaoping Commandery (高平) in Yuan province (原州; roughly in modern Guyuan, Ningxia). In 524, responding to Poliuhan Baling's uprising along the Six Garrisons in the north, the people of Gaoping rebelled and installed Hu Chen as their leader. Moqi became a general of Hu Chen, and in 525, he along with Suqin Mingda and others invaded Jing province, during which he led light cavalry to occasionally harass the reinforcements led by Wei commander, Xiao Baoyin.

In 526, one of Hu Chen's generals, Lü Bodu (呂伯度), captured Xianqin (顯親; in present-day Qin'an County, Gansu) and surrendered to the Wei, who appointed him the Inspector of Jing province. Moqi led his troops to attack Lü and killed him, after which he power grew immensely that Xiao Baoyin was unable to contain him. Soon after, Hu Chen was assassinated by a follower sent by Poliuhan Baling, who was angry that Hu had refused to help him despite allying with another rebel leader, Mozhe Niansheng. With Hu Chen dead, Moqi effectively took command over the Gaoping rebels.

In 527, Xiao Baoyin subjugated Mozhe Niansheng's forces, but later that year, he himself carried out a rebellion against Wei, which swiftly ended in failure. Xiao and his family fled to Moqi Chounu, who appointed him as Grand Tutor. In June or July 528, Moqi proclaimed himself as Emperor and began handing out appointments to his subordinates. At the time, there was a lion from Persia that was being sent to the Northern Wei as gift. Moqi managed to seize the lion and used it as his symbol, even changing the reign era to Shenshou (神獸; meaning "Divine Beast") in dedication to it. In 529, Moqi Chounu invaded Eastern Qin province (東秦州; roughly present-day Baoji, Shaanxi), capturing the region and killing the provisional inspector, Gao Zilang (高子朗).

Soon after in early 530, the Wei paramount general, Erzhu Rong commissioned his cousin, Erzhu Tianguang to lead an expedition to quell the unrest in the western provinces, with Heba Yue and Houmochen Yue serving as his deputies. In March or April, Moqi Chounu personally laid siege to Qi province while sending his generals, Moqi Wu (万俟仵) and Yuchi Pusa (尉遲菩薩) to cross south of the Wei River from Wugong and attack the Northern Wei camps. Yuchi successfully captured them before returning to Qi. However, he was later drawn back to the Wei River when he received news that Heba Yue was killing and plundering Moqi's followers and officials around the area. Through deception, Heba Yue dealt Yuchi's forces a great defeat and captured him alive.

Moqi Chounu was terrified by Yuchi's defeat that he abandoned Qi and fled to Anding, setting up garrisons at Pingting (平亭) to the north of the city in anticipation for an attack. In April or May, a rumour began to spread that the Wei army were delaying their assault on Anding for the autumn, as the summer was too hot for their soldiers. Believing the rumour, Moqi decided to disband his army and had his followers along the Xi River (細川) to the north of Qi province. He also instructed his general, Hou Yuanjin (侯元進) to lead 5,000 soldiers and set up camp in several different strategic locations.

With their guard lowered, Heba then attacked and defeated Hou Yuanjin at dawn. He captured Hou and his followers but immediately released them, encouraging the other forts under Moqi to surrender. As Heba Yue reached Anding, the rebel Inspector of Jing province, Qiji Changgui (俟幾長貴), surrendered as well. Moqi abandoned Pingting, intending to flee back to Gaoping, but Heba's forces caught up with him at Pingliang. Before Moqi could get his soldiers to form a line, Heba's general, Houmochen Chong, rode into his ranks and captured Moqi alive from his horse. His troops were afraid to pursue Houmochen, and as the Wei forces approached them, they collapsed and scattered. When Erzhu Tianguang attacked Gaoping, Xiao Baoyin also surrendered the city.

Moqi Chounu and Xiao Baoyin were sent to the Wei capital, Luoyang. Emperor Xiaozhuang ordered for them to be displayed along the main street outside of Changhe Gate (閶闔門), where people gathered to watch them for three days. Soon, Moqi Chounu was beheaded in the city. His brother, Moqi Daoluo (万俟道洛) was able to escape to the mountains following their defeat, joining the bandit leader Wang Qingyun (王慶雲) at Lüeyang Commandery (略陽郡; in modern Tianshui, Gansu). However, in July or August 530, they too were defeated and killed by Heba and Erzhu.

== Sources ==
- Book of Wei
- History of the Northern Dynasties
- Zizhi Tongjian
