= Jingchuan County =

Jingchuan County 泾川县 Kingchwan
- County
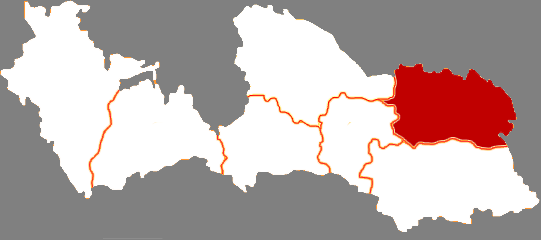
- Jingchuan in Pingliang

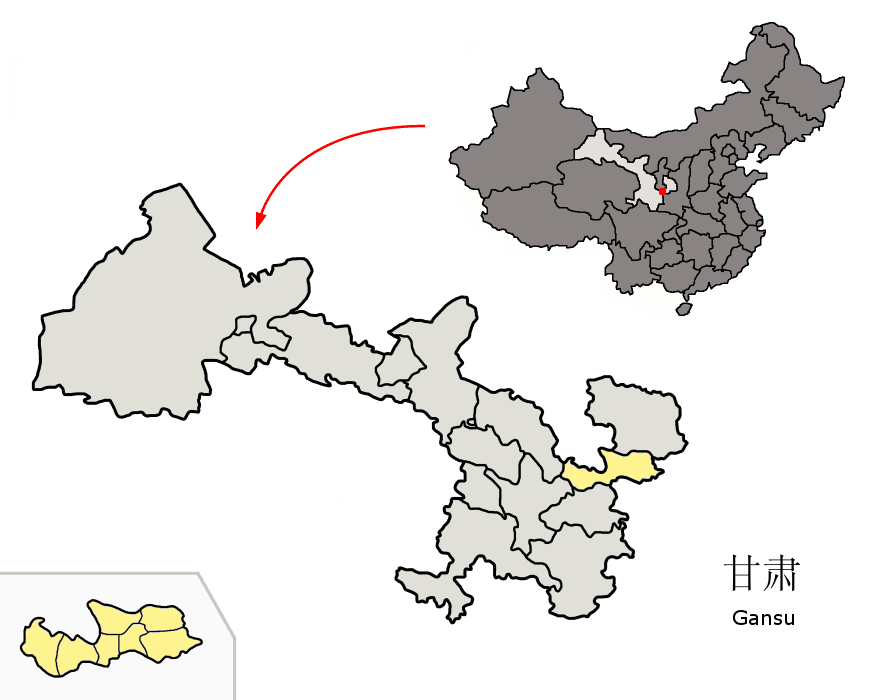
- Pingliang in Gansu
- Coordinates (Jingchuan government): 35°19′58″N 107°22′04″E
- Country: China
- Province: Gansu
- Prefecture-level city: Pingliang
- County seat: Chengguan

Area
  - County: 1,409.3 km^{2} (544.1 sq mi)
- Highest elevation: 1,460 m (4,790 ft)
- Lowest elevation: 930 m (3,050 ft)

Population (2020)
  - County: 356,200
  - Density: 252.7/km^{2} (654.6/sq mi)
  - Rural: 317,000
- Time zone: UTC+8 (China Standard)
- Postal code: 744300
- Website: www.jingchuan.gov.cn/index.html

Jingchuan County (simplified Chinese: 泾川县; traditional Chinese: 涇川縣; pinyin: Jīngchuān Xiàn) is a county under jurisdiction of the prefecture-level city of Pingliang, in the east of Gansu Province, China, bordering Shaanxi Province to the southeast. It has a land area of 1,486 square kilometers. The county is named after the Jing River. In 2020 it had a population of 356,200, over 300,000 of whom in the rural area.

== History ==
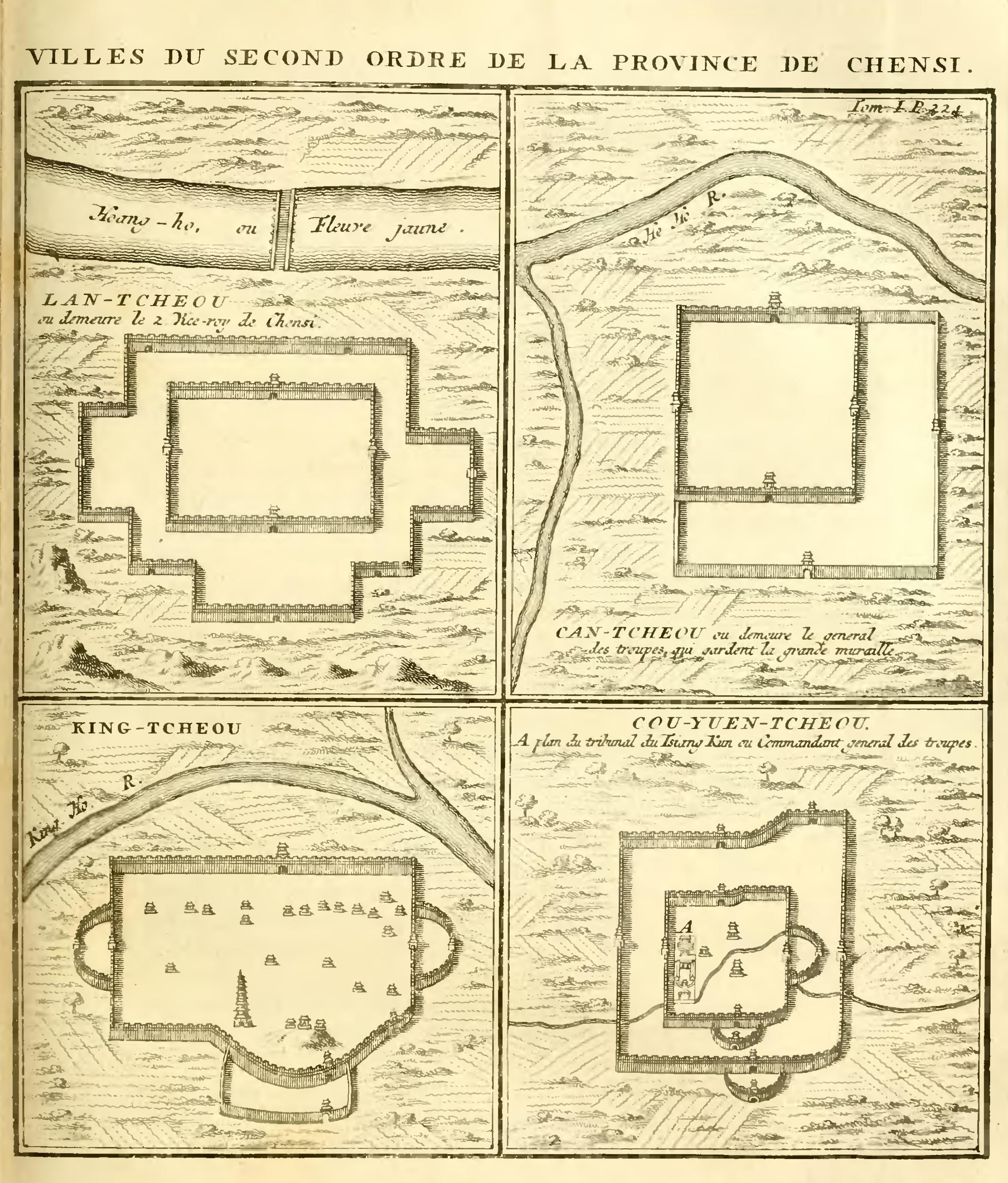
"King-tcheou" and other "second-order" towns of Shaan-Gan from Du Halde's 1736 Description of China, based on reports from Jesuit missionaries

Under the name Jingzhou, Jingchuan was formerly the seat of Gansu's Jing Prefecture. The site of former Jingzhou is near the county seat of Jingchuan. The ancient city was built starting in the period of the Western Han dynasty and abandoned in the early Ming dynasty. Parts of the old city are still preserved.

During the Republic of China (1912–1949) period it was renamed from Jing County to Jingchuan to avoid confusion with Anhui's Jing County which shared the same name.

Since 1983, Jingchuan has been a model county for reforestation of the Loess Plateau. It is a key county in the Three-North Shelter Forest Program.

== Economy ==
Jingchuan is a large producer of apples, in 2015 it cultivated 400,000 tons of fruit, mostly Fuji apples. Other agricultural produce includes carrots, cabbage, and persimmon.

== Administrative divisions ==
Jingchuan County is divided to 1 subdistrict, 11 towns and 3 townships. The seat of government is Chengguan Town.

Subdistricts

- Chengshishequ (城市社区街道)

Towns

- Chengguan (城关镇)
- Yudu (玉都镇)
- Gaoping (高平镇)
- Libao (荔堡镇)

-Towns are upgraded from Township.

- Wangcun (王村镇)
- Yaodian (窑店镇)
- Feiyun (飞云镇)
- Fengtai (丰台镇)
- Dangyuan (党原镇)
- Shefeng (汭丰镇) - it is renamed from Neifeng.
- Taiping (太平镇)

Townships

- Luohandong Township (罗汉洞乡)
- Jingming Township (泾明乡)
- Honghe Township (红河乡)

== Climate ==
Climate data for Jingchuan, elevation 1,029 m (3,376 ft), (1991–2020 normals, extremes 1981–2010)
Month	Jan	Feb	Mar	Apr	May	Jun	Jul	Aug	Sep	Oct	Nov	Dec	Year
Record high °C (°F)	14.8 (58.6)	23.8 (74.8)	30.0 (86.0)	35.5 (95.9)	35.3 (95.5)	38.9 (102.0)	40.0 (104.0)	36.2 (97.2)	36.2 (97.2)	28.5 (83.3)	23.1 (73.6)	16.4 (61.5)	40.0 (104.0)
Mean daily maximum °C (°F)	3.8 (38.8)	7.9 (46.2)	14.1 (57.4)	20.6 (69.1)	24.9 (76.8)	28.8 (83.8)	30.1 (86.2)	28.1 (82.6)	23.0 (73.4)	17.2 (63.0)	11.2 (52.2)	5.2 (41.4)	17.9 (64.2)
Daily mean °C (°F)	−4.0 (24.8)	0.2 (32.4)	6.2 (43.2)	12.5 (54.5)	16.9 (62.4)	21.2 (70.2)	23.4 (74.1)	21.8 (71.2)	16.7 (62.1)	10.3 (50.5)	3.4 (38.1)	−2.5 (27.5)	10.5 (50.9)
Mean daily minimum °C (°F)	−9.6 (14.7)	−5.3 (22.5)	0.0 (32.0)	5.3 (41.5)	9.6 (49.3)	14.3 (57.7)	17.8 (64.0)	17.1 (62.8)	12.2 (54.0)	5.4 (41.7)	−1.7 (28.9)	−7.7 (18.1)	4.8 (40.6)
Record low °C (°F)	−21.3 (−6.3)	−18.7 (−1.7)	−9.7 (14.5)	−5.8 (21.6)	0.1 (32.2)	5.7 (42.3)	9.5 (49.1)	7.0 (44.6)	2.5 (36.5)	−6.1 (21.0)	−15.7 (3.7)	−21.9 (−7.4)	−21.9 (−7.4)
Average precipitation mm (inches)	5.1 (0.20)	7.6 (0.30)	17.0 (0.67)	30.9 (1.22)	45.9 (1.81)	66.1 (2.60)	105.1 (4.14)	107.5 (4.23)	79.5 (3.13)	42.9 (1.69)	14.5 (0.57)	2.8 (0.11)	524.9 (20.67)
Average precipitation days (≥ 0.1 mm)	4.0	4.6	6.3	6.6	8.9	9.9	11.4	10.5	11.2	9.4	5.3	2.4	90.5
Average snowy days	5.9	6.1	2.9	0.5	0	0	0	0	0	0.2	2.8	4.4	22.8
Average relative humidity (%)	64	63	61	60	64	67	73	78	82	80	75	67	70
Mean monthly sunshine hours	159.8	146.8	174.1	200.1	220.5	213.8	204.6	180.8	139.9	142.5	156.5	163.8	2,103.2
Percentage possible sunshine	51	47	47	51	51	49	47	44	38	41	51	54	48
Source: China Meteorological Administration

== Transport ==
- China National Highway 312
- G22 Qingdao–Lanzhou Expressway
- Xi'an–Pingliang railway
