= Fen Prefecture =

Historical administrative division in Shanxi, China

Fenzhou or Fen Prefecture (汾州) was a zhou (prefecture) in imperial China centering on modern Fenyang, Shanxi, China. It existed (intermittently) from 488 to 1912. During the Ming dynasty and Qing dynasty it was known as Fenzhou Prefecture (汾州府; Fenzhou Fu).
