= Book of Zhou =

Official history about the Northern Zhou dynasty

- Traditional Chinese: 周書
- Simplified Chinese: 周书
Transcriptions
Standard Mandarin
- Hanyu Pinyin: Zhōu Shū
Southern Min
- Hokkien POJ: Chiu-su
- Tâi-lô: Tsiu-su

The Book of Zhou (Zhōu Shū) records the official history of the Xianbei-led Western Wei and Northern Zhou dynasties of China, and ranks among the official Twenty-Four Histories of imperial China. Compiled by the Tang dynasty historian Linghu Defen, the work was completed in 636 CE and consists of 50 chapters, some of which have been lost and replaced from other sources.

The book was criticised by Liu Zhiji for its attempt to glorify the ancestors of Tang dynasty officials of the time.

== Sources ==
Compilation began with Liu Qiu 柳虯 (502-555) in the Western Wei, who was vice-director of the Palace Library. Liu Qiu was assigned to compile the imperial diary in 550. Liu Qiu was succeeded by Niu Hong 牛弘 (545-610) who also worked on the imperial diary and later became Director of the Palace Library. Niu Hong compiled an incomplete history of the Western Wei and Northern Zhou. In 629, Emperor Taizong of Tang appointed a team headed by Linghu Defen to work on compiling the Book of Zhou. The other team members were Cen Weben and Cui Renshi.

== Translations ==
Two partial translations have been published. Dien provides a translation of volume 11 on the biography of Yuwen Hu. Miller provides a partial translation of volume 50 on accounts of Western nations.

== Contents ==
=== Annals (帝紀) ===
#	Title	Translation	Notes
Volume 1	帝紀第1 文帝上	Emperor Wen	
Volume 2	帝紀第2 文帝下	Emperor Wen	
Volume 3	帝紀第3 孝閔帝	Emperor Xiaomin	
Volume 4	帝紀第4 明帝	Emperor Ming	
Volume 5	帝紀第5 武帝上	Emperor Wu	
Volume 6	帝紀第6 武帝下	Emperor Wu	
Volume 7	帝紀第7 宣帝	Emperor Xuan	
Volume 8	帝紀第8 靜帝	Emperor Jing	

=== Biographies (列傳) ===
#	Title	Translation	Notes
Volume 9	列傳第1 皇后	Empresses	
Volume 10	列傳第2 邵惠公顥 杞簡公連 莒荘公洛生 虞國公仲	Yuwen Hao	
Volume 11	列傳第3 晉蕩公護	Yuwen Hu	
Volume 12	列傳第4 齊煬王憲	Yuwen Xian	
Volume 13	列傳第5 文閔明武宣諸子	Princes of Wen; Princes of Xiaomin; Princes of Ming; Princes of Wu; Princes of Xuan	
Volume 14	列傳第6 賀拔勝 賀拔允 賀拔岳 侯莫陳悅 念賢	Heba Sheng; Heba Yue; Houmochen Yue; Nian Xian	
Volume 15	列傳第7 寇洛 李弼 李輝 李耀 于謹	Li Bi; Yu Jin	
Volume 16	列傳第8 趙貴 獨孤信 侯莫陳崇	Zhao Gui; Dugu Xin; Houmochen Chong	
Volume 17	列傳第9 梁禦 若干惠 怡峯 劉亮 王德	Liang Yu; Ruogan Hui; Yi Feng; Liu Liang; Wang De	
Volume 18	列傳第10 王羆 王慶遠 王述 王思政	Wang Pi; Wang Qingyuan; Wang Shu; Wang Sizheng	
Volume 19	列傳第11 達奚武 侯莫陳順 豆盧寧 豆盧永恩 宇文貴 楊忠 王雄	Daxi Wu; Houmochen Shun; Doulu Ning; Doulu Yong'en; Yuwen Gui; Yang Zhong; Wang Xiong	
Volume 20	列傳第12 王盟 王勵 王懋 賀蘭祥 尉遲綱 叱列伏龜 閻慶	Wang Ming; Wang Li; Wang Mao; Helan Xiang; Yuchi Gang; Chilie Fugui; Yan Qing	
Volume 21	列傳第13 尉遲迥 王謙 司馬消難	Yuchi Jiong; Wang Qian; Sima Xiaonan	
Volume 22	列傳第14 周惠達 楊寬 楊鈞 柳慶 柳機 柳弘	Zhou Huida; Yang Kuan; Yang Jun; Liu Qing; Liu Ji; Liu Hong	
Volume 23	列傳第15 蘇綽	Su Chuo	
Volume 24	列傳第16 盧弁	Lu Bian	
Volume 25	列傳第17 李賢 李遠	Li Xian; Li Yuan	
Volume 26	列傳第18 長孫儉 長孫紹遠 斛斯徵	Zhangsun Jian; Zhangsun Shaoyuan; Husi Zheng	
Volume 27	列傳第19 赫連達 韓果 蔡祐 常善 辛威 厙狄昌 田弘 梁椿 梁台 宇文測	Helian Da; Han Guo; Cai You; Chang Shan; Xin Wei; Kudi Chang; Tian Hong; Liang Chun; Liang Tai; Yuwen Ce	
Volume 28	列傳第20 史寧 陸騰 賀若敦 權景宣	Shi Ning; Lu Teng; Heruo Dun; Quan Jingxuan	
Volume 29	列傳第21 王傑 王勇 宇文虯 宇文盛 耿豪 高琳 李和 伊婁穆 楊紹 王雅 達奚寔 劉雄 侯植	Wang Jie; Wang Yong; Yuwen Qiu; Yuwen Sheng; Geng Hao; Gao Lin; Li He; Yi Luomu; Yang Shao; Wang Ya; Daxi Shi; Liu Xiong; Hou Zhi	
Volume 30	列傳第22 竇熾 竇善 于翼	Dou Chi; Dou Shan; Yu Yi	
Volume 31	列傳第23 韋孝寬 韋敻 梁士彥	Wei Xiaokuan; Wei Xiong; Liang Shiyan	
Volume 32	列傳第24 申徽 陸通 柳敏 盧柔 唐瑾	Shen Hui; Lu Tong; Liu Min; Lu Rou; Tang Jin	
Volume 33	列傳第25 厙狄峙 楊薦 趙剛 王慶 趙昶 王悅 趙文表	Kudi Zhi; Yang Jian; Zhao Gang; Wang Qing; Zhao Chang; Wang Yue; Zhao Wenbiao	
Volume 34	列傳第26 趙善 元定 楊摽 裴寬 楊敷	Zhao Shan; Yuan Ding; Yang Bian; Pei Kuan; Yang Fu	
Volume 35	列傳第27 鄭孝穆 崔謙 崔猷 裴俠 薛端 薛善	Zheng Xiaomu; Cui Qian; Cui You; Pei Xia; Xue Duan; Xue Shan	
Volume 36	列傳第28 鄭偉 楊纂 段永 王士良 崔彥穆 令狐整 司馬裔 裴果	Zheng Wei; Yang Zuan; Duan Yong; Wang Shiliang; Cui Yanmu; Linghu Zheng; Sima Yi; Pei Guo	
Volume 37	列傳第29 寇儁 韓褒 趙肅 徐招 張軌 李彥 郭彥 裴文舉	Kou Jun; Han Bao; Zhao Su; Xu Zhao; Zhang Gui; Li Yan; Guo Yan; Pei Wenju	
Volume 38	列傳第30 蘇亮 柳虯 呂思禮 薛憕 薛真 李昶 元偉	Su Liang; Liu Qiu; Lü Sili; Xue Cheng; Xue Zhen; Li Chang, Yuan Wei	
Volume 39	列傳第31 韋瑱 梁昕 皇甫璠 辛慶之 王子直 杜杲	Wei Tian; Liang Xin; Huangfu Fan; Xin Qingzhi; Wang Zizhi; Du Gao	
Volume 40	列傳第32 尉遲運 王軌 宇文神舉 宇文孝伯 顏之儀	Yuchi Yun; Wang Gui; Yuwen Shenju; Yuwen Xiaobo; Yan Zhiyi	
Volume 41	列傳第33 王褒 庾信	Wang Bao; Yu Xin	
Volume 42	列傳第34 蕭撝 蕭世怡 蕭圓肅 蕭大圜 宗懍 劉璠 柳霞	Xiao Hui; Xiao Yuansu; Xiao Dahuan; Liu Fan	
Volume 43	列傳第35 李延孫 韋祐 韓雄 陳忻 魏玄	Li Yansun; Wei You; Han Xiong; Chen Xin; Wei Xuan	
Volume 44	列傳第36 泉企 李遷哲 楊乾運 扶猛 陽雄 席固 任果	Quan Qi; Li Qianzhe; Yang Qianyun; Fu Meng; Yang Xiong; Xi Gu; Ren Guo	
Volume 45	列傳第37 儒林	Confucian Scholars	
Volume 46	列傳第38 孝義	Filial Piety	
Volume 47	列傳第39 藝術	Artists	
Volume 48	列傳第40 蕭詧	Xiao Cha; Xiao Kui; Xiao Cong	
Volume 49	列傳第41 異域上	Goguryeo; Baekje; Nanman; Rau peoples; Dangchang; Dengzhi; Bailan; Di; Jihu; Kumo Xi	
Volume 50	列傳第42 異域下	Turkic Khaganate; Tuyuhun; Gaochang; Shanshan; Karasahr; Kucha; Kingdom of Khotan; Hephthalite Empire; Sogdia; Parthian Empire; Sasanian Empire	
