= Six Garrisons =

Military towns of the Northern Wei dynasty of China

The Six Garrisons (red) and contemporary dynastic capitals (green) in northern China

The Six Garrisons (simplified Chinese: 六镇; traditional Chinese: 六鎮), also known as the Six Frontier Towns and the Northern Frontier Towns (simplified Chinese: 北镇; traditional Chinese: 北鎮), were six military towns located in the Hetao region of the Northern Wei dynasty of China. The government established the towns during the Huangshi and Yanhe eras to prevent the southward invasion by the Rouran Khaganate. These towns were, from west to east, Woye, Huaishuo, Wuchuan, Fumin, Rouxuan and Huaihuang.

The town of Woye was initially located in the old city of Woye of the Han dynasty, southwest of today's Linhe in Inner Mongolia. It was later relocated to Shuofang, north of today's Hanggin Banner. The town of Huaishuo was located in southwest of today's Guyang, Inner Mongolia. Later its name was changed to Shuozhou. The town of Wuchuan was located in the west of today's Wuchuan, Inner Mongolia. In 528, it became a district (郡). The town of Fumin was located in the southeast of today's Siziwang Banner. The town of Rouxuan was located in the northwest of today's Xinghe, Inner Mongolia. The town of Huaihuang was located in the northwest of today's Chicheng, Hebei.

== The Six Garrisons ==
Name	Chinese: Traditional / Simplified	Pinyin / Wade-Giles	Present day	Location
Woye	沃野鎮 / 沃野镇	wòyě zhèn / wo-yeh chen	Woye City ruins, Northeast of Linhe District, Bayan Nur, Inner Mongolia	41.1400°N 108.7947°E
Huaishuo	懷朔鎮 / 怀朔镇	huáishuò zhèn / huai-shuo chen	Bailingnao City ruins, Bailingnao, Northeast of Guyang County, Baotou, Inner Mongolia	41.2097°N 110.1336°E
Wuchuan	武川鎮 / 武川镇	wǔchuān zhèn / wu-ch'uan chen	Erfenzi City ruins, Erfenzi Township, West of Wuchuan County, Hohhot, Inner Mongolia	41.3611°N 110.6996°E
Fuming	撫冥鎮 / 抚冥镇	fǔmíng zhèn / fu-ming chen	Tuchengzi City ruins, Southeast of Siziwang Banner, Inner Mongolia	41.4628°N 111.7433°E
Rouxuan	柔玄鎮 / 柔玄镇	róuxuán zhèn / jou-hsüan chen	Halagou City ruins, Taijimiao, Northwest of Xinghe County, Ulanqab, Inner Mongolia	41.2573°N 113.9616°E
Huaihuang	懷荒鎮 / 怀荒镇	huáihuāng zhèn / huai-huang chen	Baiyin Tsagan City ruins, Zhangbei County, Zhangjiakou, Hebei	

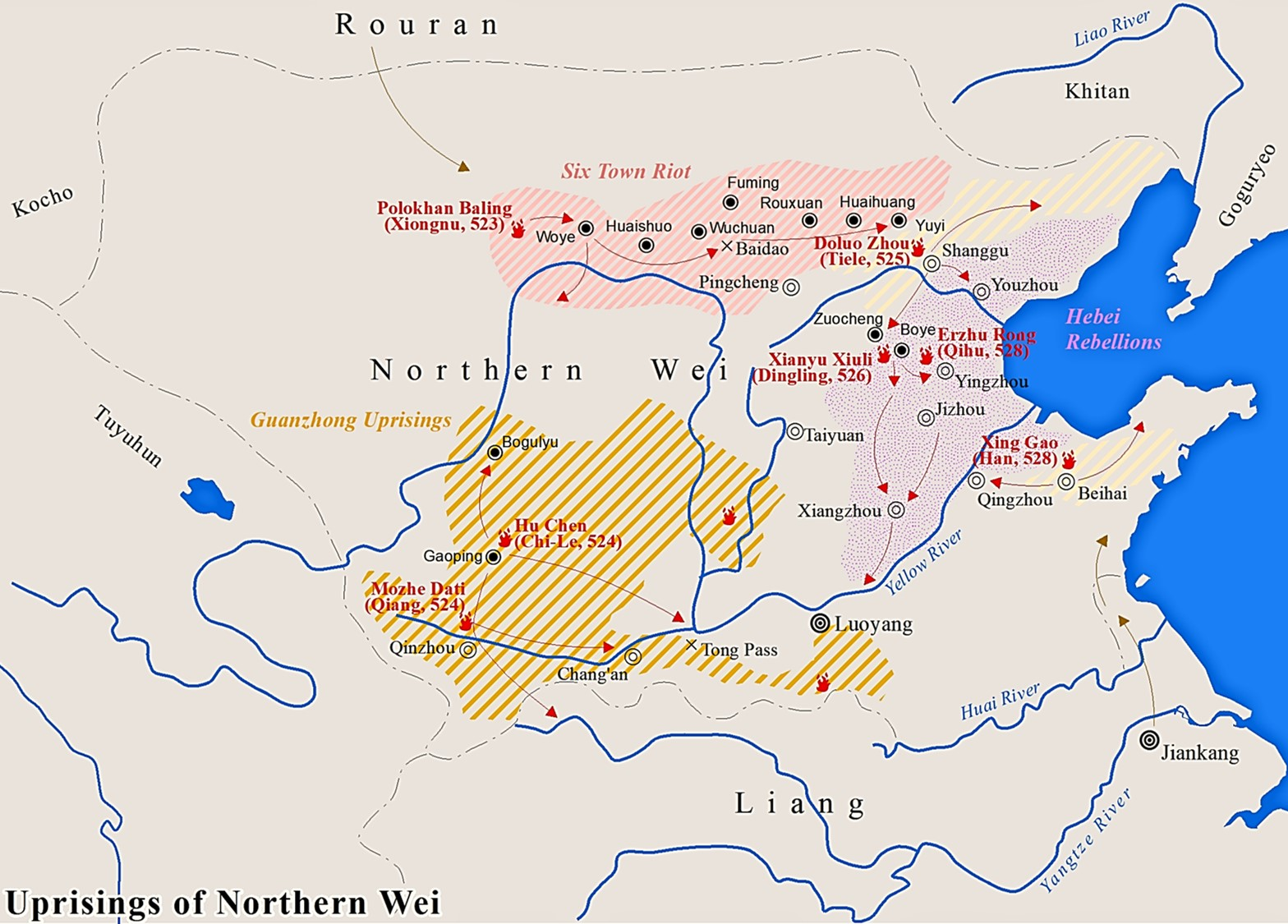
Location of the six garrisons during the riot of 523.

== Rebellion of the Six Garrisons ==
The fall of Northern Wei began with rebellions staged by the populations of the Six Garrisons. Conventional narratives state that the location of the capital to Luoyang under Emperor Xiaowen and decades of relative peace in the north had sidelined the traditional Xianbei warriors in six garrisons, creating resentment against the reform of Emperor Xiaowen. Their ranks had also grown tainted by the introduction of convicts in penal military service. However, recent studies question this argument. This rebellion was rooted in the internal struggle within the Six Garrisons between upper-class military elites and lower-class soldiers and ethnic settlers and was directly triggered by a serious drought causing a massive loss of livestock and leading to the looting of Avars. The Six Garrisons were established to protect the Northern Wei regime from the invasion of Rouran and consisted of numerous ethnic groups, such as Xianbei, Han, Gaoche, and Xiongnu. Tribes were the basic social units, although grouped into militarized garrisons. The upper-class military elites who occupied governing offices mainly included the low-level elites of the Xianbei (including political exiles), other tribe chiefs, and Han strongpersons. The internal conflict between upper-class military elites and lower-class soldiers and ethnic settlers was on the basis of the vulnerable economic base (Note: heavy reliance on livestock production and the support from the central government) and harsh environmental conditions in Six Garrison areas. The struggle for survival drove military officers of the Six Garrisons to implement unfair policies biased to their own ethnic groups at the cost of others. In 523, nomadic Rouran tribes suffered a major famine due to successive years of drought. In April, the Rouran Khan sent troops to raid the Wei territory. People of the town rose up and killed the town's commander.

Rebellion soon broke out against the Luoyang court across the region. In Woye, Poliuhan Baling (破六韓拔陵) became a rebel leader. His army quickly took Woye and laid siege to Wuchuan and Huaishuo.

Elsewhere in Qinzhou (modern Gansu province), Qiang leaders such as Mozhe Dati (莫折大提) also rose up. In Gaoping (present-day Guyuan), Hu Chen (胡琛) and the Xiongnu rebelled and titled himself the King of Gaoping.

The Poliuhan Baling rebellion was defeated in 525. However, similar rebellions had spread to other regions such as Hebei and Guanzhong and were pacified by the Erzhu (爾朱) clan by 530.

Many generals who later became prominent after the division of Northern Wei into Western and Eastern Wei, (Note: later Northern Zhou and Northern Qi respectively) including Yuwen Tai, Gao Huan and Hou Jing, took part in the rebellion.

== See also ==
- Ordos Loop
