= Jing Prefecture (Gansu) =

Former administrative division of China

Jingzhou or Jing Prefecture (涇州) was a zhou (prefecture) in imperial China, centering on modern Jingchuan County, Gansu, China. It was created in the 5th century by Northern Wei and existed (intermittently) until 1913 after the establishment of the Republic of China.

== Geography ==
The administrative region probably includes parts of modern:

- Under the administration of Pingliang, Gansu:
  - Jingchuan County
  - Pingliang
  - Chongxin County
  - Huating County
  - Lingtai County
- Under the administration of Xianyang, Shaanxi:
  - Changwu County
  - Bin County
  - Xunyi County
  - Yongshou County
- Under the administration of Guyuan, Ningxia:
  - Jingyuan County
