= Jihu =

The Jihu (Chinese: 稽胡), also known as the Buluoji (Chinese: 步落稽), Buluojian (Chinese: 步落堅), and Shanhu (Chinese: 山胡), were a Hu people who lived along the Yellow River in northern Guannei and Hedong during the 7th century AD. According to Jonathan Karam Skaff, the Jihu had facial features distinct from the local Han people and were described as having "Barbarian heads and Han tongues." The majority of Jihu retained their native tongue and with the exception of their chiefs, none spoke Chinese. The men dressed similarly to the Han and practiced similar martial ethos while the women wore shell jewelry and were known to have sexual relations before marriage. They produced a special type of linen known as "barbarian female linen" or "Ji female linen". The Jihu worshiped a local Jihu Buddhist saint and constructed earthen pagodas with cypress flagpoles decorated with silkworm cocoons. The Jihu participated in raids against the Tang dynasty along with the Turks in the early 620s but eventually submitted to the Tang in 626.

== Bibliography ==
- Skaff, Jonathan Karam (2012), Sui-Tang China and Its Turko-Mongol Neighbors: Culture, Power, and Connections, 580-800 (Oxford Studies in Early Empires), Oxford University Press
