= Wuchuan County, Inner Mongolia =

Wuchuan County 武川县 • ᠦᠴᠤᠸᠠᠨ ᠰᠢᠶᠠᠨ Wuchwan, Wu-ch'uan
- County
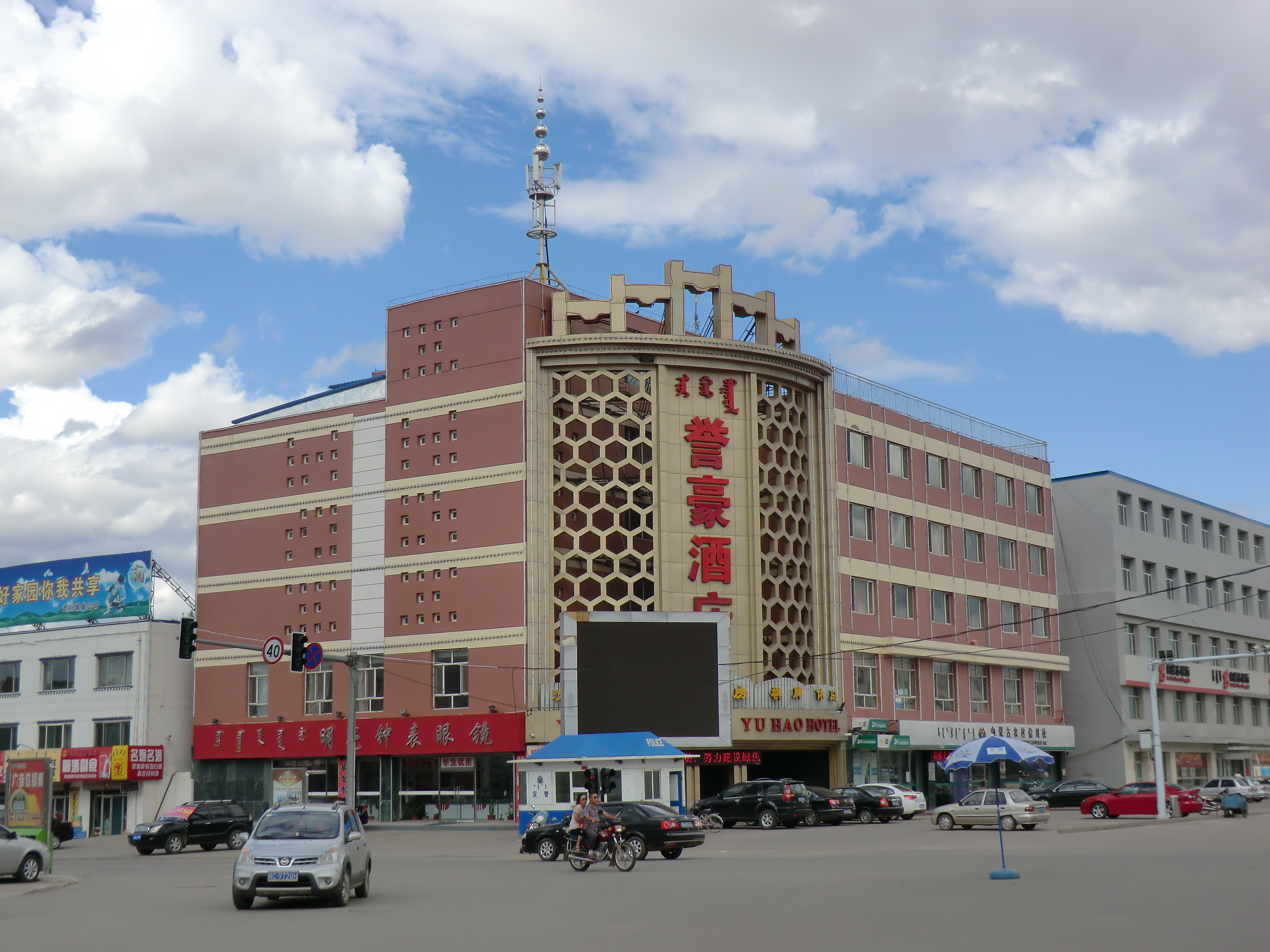
- One of the main corners of downtown Wuchuan

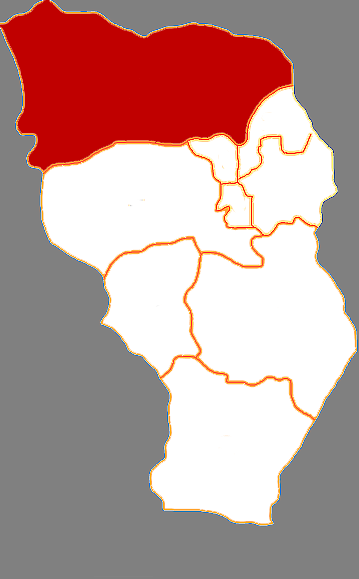
- Wuchuan in Hohhot

- Location within Inner Mongolia Location within China
- Coordinates: 41°05′38″N 111°27′07″E
- Country: China
- Autonomous region: Inner Mongolia
- Prefecture-level city: Hohhot
- County seat: Hoh Ereg

Area
  - Total: 4,885 km^{2} (1,886 sq mi)

Population (2020)
  - Total: 95,869
  - Density: 19.63/km^{2} (50.83/sq mi)
  - Major nationalities: Han Chinese Mongolian
- Time zone: UTC+8 (China Standard)
- Website: www.wuchuan.gov.cn

Wuchuan County, Inner Mongolia

Chinese name
- Simplified Chinese: 武川县
- Traditional Chinese: 武川縣
Transcriptions
Standard Mandarin
- Hanyu Pinyin: Wǔchuān Xiàn

Mongolian name
- Mongolian Cyrillic: Үчуань шянь
- Mongolian script: ᠦᠴᠤᠸᠠᠨ ᠰᠢᠶᠠᠨ
Transcriptions
- SASM/GNC: Üčuvan siyan

Wuchuan (Mongolian: ᠦᠴᠤᠸᠠᠨ ᠰᠢᠶᠠᠨ; Chinese: 武川县), is a county of Inner Mongolia Autonomous Region, North China, it is under the administration of the prefecture-level city of Hohhot, the capital of Inner Mongolia. Wuchuan has an area of 4,885 km^{2} (1,886 sq mi) with a population of 95,869. It is connected to central Hohhot by the Huwu Highway; roughly a half-hour's drive. Zhaohe Grasslands, a popular tourist site, is nearby. The county borders the Hohhot districts of Huimin and Xincheng and the rural Tumed Left Banner to its south, Dorbod Banner of Ulanqab and Darhan Muminggan United Banner of Baotou to its north, Guyang County of Baotou to its west, and Zhuozi County of Ulanqab to its east.

== Ancient history ==
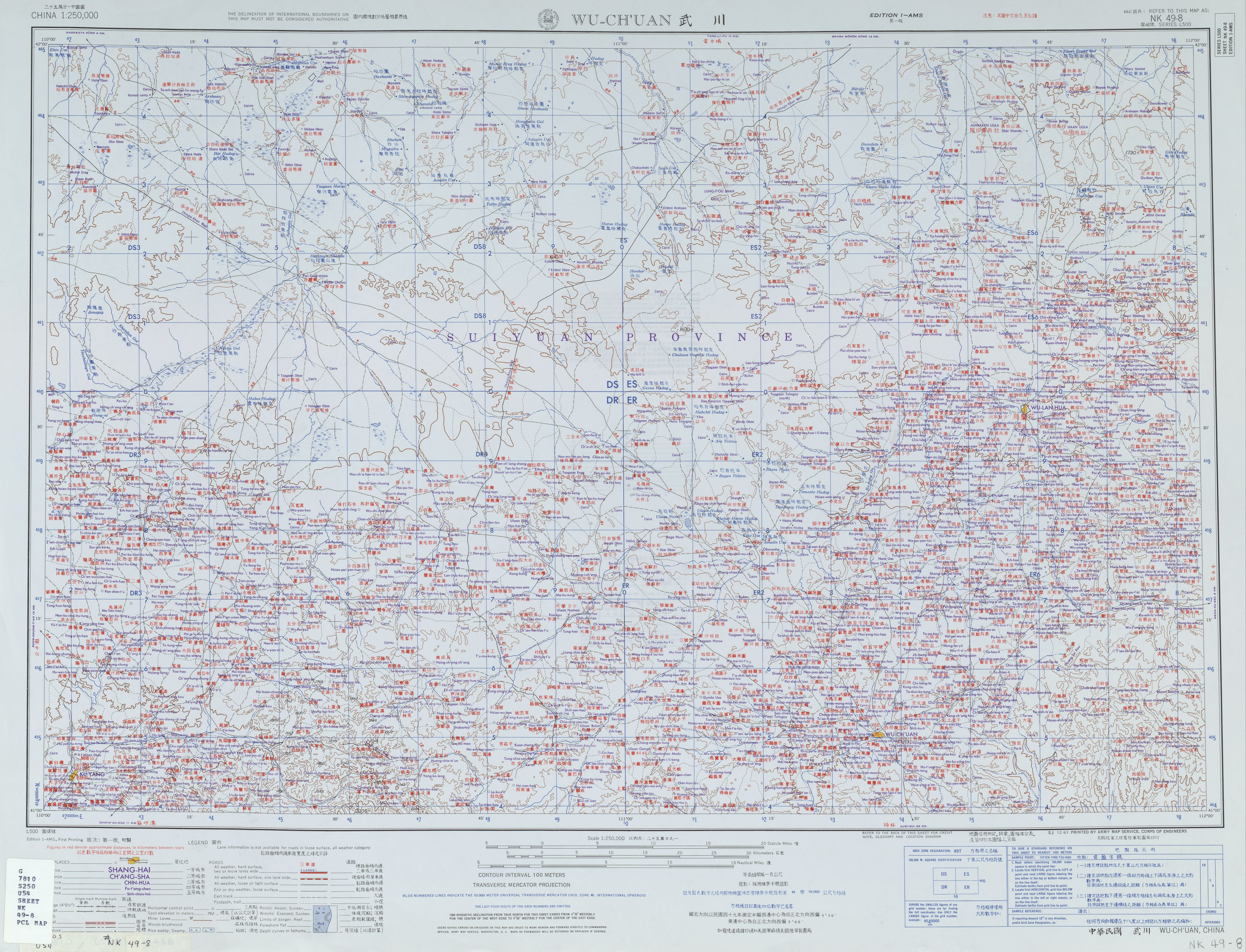
Map including Wuchuan (labeled as WU-CH'UAN 武川) (AMS, 1963)

According to the earliest records, the name Wuchuan comes from the Book of Zhou, dating from 398 AD, and the History of the Northern Dynasties. Human activity can be traced back as far as 10,000 years.

The archaeological site at Daqingshan (大青山) village includes many artefacts from the Dayao Culture (大窑文化) and proves that the area was suitable for human habitation at that time. Another Paleolithic site at Erdaowa (二道洼) Village has an estimated age of 10,000 years. Many stone tools were found there, including knives, cutters and axes, indicating that the occupants of the area were hunter-gatherers.

A more recent site from 5000 BC was found at Jinergou (井儿沟). Better stone tools and pottery were unearthed. The tools were of types used for building, harvesting and making clothes, proving that agriculture was already well established at that time.

In the Three Sovereigns and Five Emperors period, about 2800BC, many tribes settled at Wuchuan. These included the Xunyu, Shefang (舌方), Tufang (土方) and Guifang. The Yellow Emperor's war against Yunzhou was recorded in the Records of the Grand Historian by Sima Qian. During the Shang and Zhou dynasties, King Wu of Zhou fought against the Guifang tribe many times, finally winning the battle after 3 years; an event which is recorded in the I Ching.

Around 302 BC, Wuchuan belonged to the State of Zhao, one of the Warring States. The king of Zhao defeated Hulinloufan and built a wall near Daqing Mountain to stop the advance of the northern tribes. This event was recorded in the Commentary on the Water Classic. The wall is now called the South Daqing Mountain Great Wall. Wuchuan also plays a role in the history of the Qin dynasty and the Han dynasty, especially the Battle of Changping of Zhao Kuo. During this time, Wuchuan was controlled by the Xiongnu, a nomadic people famous for their bronzes and animal carvings. A Xiongnu dagger together with some knife-shaped coins from the State of Yan were unearthed at Tuchenzi Village, indicating that cultural exchanges between the Xiongnu and the Han Chinese were very extensive at that time. A total of more than 20 ancient tombs of the Qin and Han period have also been discovered in Wuchuan.

Later, Wuchuan was one of the capitals of the Southern and Northern dynasties. A tomb was found at Tuchenliang village, containing ancient coins, weapons, and many other bronze and iron artefacts. A Roman gold seal was unearthed at Touhao village and some Persian silver coins from the Sassanid dynasty were discovered at Baidao Cheng village. This indicates that during the period of the Northern Wei, Sui and Tang dynasties, a northern silk road existed, stretching from Xi'an to Datong to Huhhot and crossing Daqing Mountain to Wuchuan, eventually reaching the Middle East and finally Rome.

In 916, Wuchuan belonged to the state of Khitan. Archeological sites have also been found from the Yuan, Liao and Jin states. Some Song dynasty coins were also unearthed. In addition, eight ancient tombs and seven ruins of towns from that period were discovered around the area of Dongtucheng along the river Qiangpan.

== Administrative divisions ==
Wuchuan County is made up of 3 towns and 6 townships.

Name	Simplified Chinese	Hanyu Pinyin	Mongolian (Hudum Script)	Mongolian (Cyrillic)	Administrative division code
Towns
Hoh Ereg Town	可可以力更镇	Kěkěyǐlìgēng Zhèn	ᠬᠥᠬᠡ ᠡᠷᠭᠢ ᠪᠠᠯᠭᠠᠰᠤ	Хөх эргэ балгас	150125100
Harul Town	哈乐镇	Hālè Zhèn	ᠬᠠᠷᠠᠭᠤᠯ ᠪᠠᠯᠭᠠᠰᠤ	Харуул балгас	150125101
West Ulan Bulag Town	西乌兰不浪镇	Xīwūlánbùlàng Zhèn	ᠪᠠᠷᠠᠭᠤᠨ ᠤᠯᠠᠭᠠᠨᠪᠤᠯᠠᠭ ᠪᠠᠯᠭᠠᠰᠤ	Баруун улаанбулаг балгас	150125102
Townships
Daqingshan Township	大青山乡	Dàqīngshān Xiāng	ᠳ᠋ᠠ ᠴᠢᠩ ᠱᠠᠨ ᠰᠢᠶᠠᠩ	Да чин шин шиян	150125200
Upper Tohoi Township	上秃亥乡	Shàngtūhài Xiāng	ᠳᠡᠭᠡᠷ᠎ᠡ ᠲᠣᠬᠣᠢ ᠰᠢᠶᠠᠩ	Дээр духай шиян	150125205
Deshenggou Township	得胜沟乡	Déshènggōu Xiāng	ᠳ᠋ᠧ ᠱᠧᠩ ᠭᠧᠦ ᠰᠢᠶᠠᠩ	Те шен гүү шиян	150125207
Erfenzi Township	二份子乡	Èrfènzi Xiāng	ᠡᠯ ᠹᠧᠨ ᠽᠢ ᠰᠢᠶᠠᠩ	Эл фен зи шиян	150125211
Har Huxu Township	哈拉合少乡	Hālāhéshǎo Xiāng	ᠬᠠᠷᠠᠬᠤᠰᠢᠭᠤ ᠰᠢᠶᠠᠩ	Хархошуу шиян	150125213
Holoi Mountain Township	耗赖山乡	Hàolàishān Xiāng	ᠬᠣᠭᠣᠯᠠᠢ ᠠᠭᠤᠯᠠ ᠰᠢᠶᠠᠩ	Хоолой уул шиян	150125214

- Others:
  - Inner Mongolia Wuchuan Economic Development Zone (内蒙古武川经济开发区, ᠥᠪᠥᠷ
    ᠮᠣᠩᠭᠣᠯ ᠤᠨ
    ᠦᠴᠤᠸᠠᠨ ᠤ
    ᠠᠵᠤ ᠠᠬᠤᠢ ᠶᠢᠨ
    ᠨᠡᠭᠡᠭᠡᠯᠲᠡ ᠶᠢᠨ ᠣᠷᠣᠨ)
  - Wuchuan Golden Triangle Economic Development Zone (武川金三角经济开发区, ᠦᠴᠤᠸᠠᠨ
    ᠰᠢᠶᠠᠨ ᠤ
    ᠠᠯᠲᠠᠨ
    ᠭᠤᠷᠪᠠᠯᠵᠢᠨ
    ᠨᠡᠭᠡᠭᠡᠯᠲᠡ ᠶᠢᠨ
    ᠣᠷᠣᠨ)

== Climate ==
Climate data for Wuchuan, elevation 1,637 m (5,371 ft), (1991–2020 normals, extremes 1981–2010)
Month	Jan	Feb	Mar	Apr	May	Jun	Jul	Aug	Sep	Oct	Nov	Dec	Year
Record high °C (°F)	9.7 (49.5)	12.9 (55.2)	21.6 (70.9)	28.4 (83.1)	31.0 (87.8)	36.2 (97.2)	34.9 (94.8)	32.1 (89.8)	30.4 (86.7)	23.9 (75.0)	16.5 (61.7)	11.4 (52.5)	36.2 (97.2)
Mean daily maximum °C (°F)	−6.5 (20.3)	−2.3 (27.9)	4.5 (40.1)	12.7 (54.9)	19.1 (66.4)	23.7 (74.7)	25.5 (77.9)	23.7 (74.7)	18.5 (65.3)	11.2 (52.2)	2.2 (36.0)	−5.0 (23.0)	10.6 (51.1)
Daily mean °C (°F)	−14.0 (6.8)	−9.7 (14.5)	−2.5 (27.5)	5.9 (42.6)	12.6 (54.7)	17.5 (63.5)	19.7 (67.5)	17.7 (63.9)	12.1 (53.8)	4.5 (40.1)	−4.4 (24.1)	−11.8 (10.8)	4.0 (39.2)
Mean daily minimum °C (°F)	−19.5 (−3.1)	−15.6 (3.9)	−8.5 (16.7)	−0.8 (30.6)	5.6 (42.1)	11.1 (52.0)	14.0 (57.2)	12.1 (53.8)	6.4 (43.5)	−1.0 (30.2)	−9.5 (14.9)	−17 (1)	−1.9 (28.6)
Record low °C (°F)	−32.6 (−26.7)	−32.5 (−26.5)	−26.3 (−15.3)	−17.4 (0.7)	−9.8 (14.4)	−0.4 (31.3)	4.7 (40.5)	1.2 (34.2)	−6.5 (20.3)	−15.3 (4.5)	−30.6 (−23.1)	−33.6 (−28.5)	−33.6 (−28.5)
Average precipitation mm (inches)	2.1 (0.08)	3.3 (0.13)	7.3 (0.29)	14.3 (0.56)	30.4 (1.20)	48.5 (1.91)	96.5 (3.80)	75.3 (2.96)	46.4 (1.83)	19.4 (0.76)	6.8 (0.27)	2.6 (0.10)	352.9 (13.89)
Average precipitation days (≥ 0.1 mm)	4.1	4.2	5.0	4.7	7.3	11.2	13.7	11.6	9.2	4.8	4.6	4.4	84.8
Average snowy days	7.0	6.7	7.0	3.7	1.4	0.1	0	0	0.3	2.9	6.5	7.9	43.5
Average relative humidity (%)	59	52	44	37	39	49	60	64	60	55	56	59	53
Mean monthly sunshine hours	216.5	215.5	257.9	275.1	293.1	266.6	262.8	262.5	239.7	242.5	207.0	199.1	2,938.3
Percentage possible sunshine	73	71	69	68	65	59	58	62	65	72	71	70	67
Source: China Meteorological Administration
