= Hongnong Commandery =

Ancient Chinese political subdivision

Hongnong Commandery (Chinese: 弘農郡), also known as Hengnong Commandery (Chinese: 恒農郡), was a commandery of China from Han dynasty to Tang dynasty, located in modern western Henan and southeastern Shaanxi.

Hongnong was established in 113 BC. The seat was Hongnong county, near the strategic Hangu Pass. It administered 11 counties: Hongnong (弘農), Lushi (盧氏), Shan (陝), Yiyang (宜陽), Mianchi (黽池), Danshui (丹水), Xin'an (新安), Shang (商), Xi (析), Luhun (陸渾), Shangluo (上雒). The population was 475,954 in 2 AD, in 118,091 households. In 39 AD, Hu (湖) and Huayin (華陰) counties were added, while Shang and Shangluo became part of Jingzhao. The commandery had 46,815 households and a population of 199,113 in 140 AD.

Hongnong became much smaller from Jin dynasty to its dissolution in early Sui dynasty as new commanderies were created. In 607, Guo Prefecture (虢州, modern Lingbao, Henan) was renamed Hongnong Commandery. In 617, Shan Commandery was formed from the northern part of Hongnong. In Tang dynasty, Hongnong Commandery became an alternative name of Guo. In 742, the prefecture had 6 counties and 88,845 people in 28,249 households.
