= List of administrative divisions of Ningxia =

Ningxia Hui Autonomous Region
- Autonomous region
- Capital: Yinchuan

Prefecture-level divisions
- Prefectural cities: 5

County level divisions
- County cities: 2
- Counties: 11
- Districts: 9

Township level divisions
- Towns: 94
- Townships: 93
- Subdistricts: 42

Villages level divisions
- Communities: 529
- Administrative villages: 2,254

Ningxia Hui Autonomous Region, an autonomous region of the People's Republic of China, is made up of the following three levels of administrative division.

== Administrative divisions ==
All of these administrative divisions are explained in greater detail at Administrative divisions of the People's Republic of China. This chart lists only prefecture-level and county-level divisions of Ningxia.

Prefecture level	County Level					
Prefecture level	Name	Chinese	Hanyu Pinyin	Xiao'erjing	Division code	
Yinchuan city 银川市; Yínchuān Shì ىٍﭼُﻮًا شِ (Capital) (6401 / INC)	Xingqing District	兴庆区	Xīngqìng Qū	سٍشٍ ﺛُﻮْ	640104	XQN
Yinchuan city 银川市; Yínchuān Shì ىٍﭼُﻮًا شِ (Capital) (6401 / INC)	Xixia District	西夏区	Xīxià Qū	ثِشیَا ﺛُﻮ	640105	XQU
Yinchuan city 银川市; Yínchuān Shì ىٍﭼُﻮًا شِ (Capital) (6401 / INC)	Jinfeng District	金凤区	Jīnfèng Qū	دٍ ﻓْﻊ ﺛُﻮ	640106	JFU
Yinchuan city 银川市; Yínchuān Shì ىٍﭼُﻮًا شِ (Capital) (6401 / INC)	Yongning County	永宁县	Yǒngníng Xiàn	ﻳْﻮنٍ ﺷِﯿًﺎ	640121	YGN
Yinchuan city 银川市; Yínchuān Shì ىٍﭼُﻮًا شِ (Capital) (6401 / INC)	Helan County	贺兰县	Hèlán Xiàn	حْلً ﺷِﯿًﺎ	640122	HLN
Yinchuan city 银川市; Yínchuān Shì ىٍﭼُﻮًا شِ (Capital) (6401 / INC)	Lingwu city	灵武市	Língwǔ Shì	لٍءُ شِ	640181	LWU
Shizuishan city 石嘴山市; Shízuǐshān Shì شِذُﻮِشً شِ (6402 / SZS)	Dawukou District	大武口区	Dàwǔkǒu Qū	دَاءُﻛِﻮْ ﺛُﻮْ	640202	DWK
Shizuishan city 石嘴山市; Shízuǐshān Shì شِذُﻮِشً شِ (6402 / SZS)	Huinong District	惠农区	Hùinóng Qū	ﺧُﻮِﻧْﻮ ﺛُﻮْ	640205	HNO
Shizuishan city 石嘴山市; Shízuǐshān Shì شِذُﻮِشً شِ (6402 / SZS)	Pingluo County	平罗县	Píngluó Xiàn	پٍلُوَع ﺷِﯿًﺎ	640221	PLO
Wuzhong city 吴忠市; Wúzhōng Shì ءُﺟْﻮ شِ (6403 / WZS)	Litong District	利通区	Lìtōng Qū	لِتْﻮ ﺛُﻮْ	640302	LTW
Wuzhong city 吴忠市; Wúzhōng Shì ءُﺟْﻮ شِ (6403 / WZS)	Hongsibu District	红寺堡区	Hóngsìbù Qū	ﺡْﻮسِبُﻮْ ﺛُﻮْ	640303	HSE
Wuzhong city 吴忠市; Wúzhōng Shì ءُﺟْﻮ شِ (6403 / WZS)	Yanchi County	盐池县	Yánchí Xiàn	ﻳﯾًﺎچِ ﺷِﯿًﺎ	640323	YCY
Wuzhong city 吴忠市; Wúzhōng Shì ءُﺟْﻮ شِ (6403 / WZS)	Tongxin County	同心县	Tóngxīn Xiàn	ﺗْﻮسٍ ﺷِﯿًﺎ	640324	TGX
Wuzhong city 吴忠市; Wúzhōng Shì ءُﺟْﻮ شِ (6403 / WZS)	Qingtongxia city	青铜峡市	Qīngtóngxiá Shì	شِتْﻮﺷﯿَا شِ	640381	QTX
Guyuan city 固原市; Gùyuán Shì ﻗُﻮْﻳُﻮًا شِ (6404 / GYN)	Yuanzhou District	原州区	Yuánzhōu Qū	ﻳُﻮًاﺟِﻮْ ﺛُﻮْ	640402	YAZ
Guyuan city 固原市; Gùyuán Shì ﻗُﻮْﻳُﻮًا شِ (6404 / GYN)	Xiji County	西吉县	Xījí Xiàn	ثِجِ ﺷِﯿًﺎ	640422	XJI
Guyuan city 固原市; Gùyuán Shì ﻗُﻮْﻳُﻮًا شِ (6404 / GYN)	Longde County	隆德县	Lóngdé Xiàn	ﻟْﻮدْ ﺷِﯿًﺎ	640423	LDE
Guyuan city 固原市; Gùyuán Shì ﻗُﻮْﻳُﻮًا شِ (6404 / GYN)	Jingyuan County	泾源县	Jīngyuán Xiàn	دٍﻳُﻮًا ﺷِﯿًﺎ	640424	JYK
Guyuan city 固原市; Gùyuán Shì ﻗُﻮْﻳُﻮًا شِ (6404 / GYN)	Pengyang County	彭阳县	Péngyáng Xiàn	ﭘْعیْا ﺷِﯿًﺎ	640425	PEY
Zhongwei city 中卫市; Zhōngwèi Shì ﺟْﻮوِ شِ (6405 / ZWS)	Shapotou District	沙坡头区	Shāpōtóu Qū	ﺷَﺎپُتِﻮْ ﺛُﻮْ	640502	SPT
Zhongwei city 中卫市; Zhōngwèi Shì ﺟْﻮوِ شِ (6405 / ZWS)	Zhongning County	中宁县	Zhōngníng Xiàn	ﺟْﻮنٍ ﺷِﯿًﺎ	640521	ZNG
Zhongwei city 中卫市; Zhōngwèi Shì ﺟْﻮوِ شِ (6405 / ZWS)	Haiyuan County	海原县	Hǎiyuán Xiàn	ﻫَیْیُوًا ﺷِﯿًﺎ	640522	HYB

== Recent changes in administrative divisions ==
Date	Before	After	Note	Reference
1980-??-??	Yi District	Dawukou District	renamed	
1980-??-??	Er District	Shizuishan District	renamed	
1980-??-??	San District	Shitanjing District	renamed	
1983-01-18	all Province-controlled city (P-City) → Prefecture-level city (PL-City)			Civil Affairs Announcement
1983-01-18	all Prefecture-controlled city (PC-City) → County-level city (CL-City)			Civil Affairs Announcement
1983-07-29	parts of Guyuan County	Pengyang County	established	
1983-11-10	Wuzhong County	Wuzhong (CL-City)	reorganized	
1984-12-17	Qingtongxia County	Qingtongxia (CL-City)	reorganized	
1987-01-22	Jiao District, Shizuishan	Huinong County	reorganized	
1996-04-29	Lingwu County	Lingwu (CL-City)	reorganized	Civil Affairs [1996]31
1998-05-11	Yinnan Prefecture	Wuzhong (PL-City)	reorganized	State Council [1998]17
1998-05-11	Wuzhong (CL-City)	Litong District	reorganized	State Council [1998]17
2001-07-07	Guyuan Prefecture	Guyuan (PL-City)	reorganized	State Council [2001]80
2001-07-07	Guyuan County	Yuanzhou District	reorganized	State Council [2001]80
2002-10-19	Cheng District, Yinchuan	Xixia District	renamed	Civil Affairs [2002]92
2002-10-19	Xincheng District	Jinfeng District	renamed	Civil Affairs [2002]92
2002-10-19	Jiao District, Yinchuan	Xingqing District	renamed	Civil Affairs [2002]92
2002-10-19	Shitanjing District	Dawukou District	merged into	Civil Affairs [2002]92
2003-12-31	parts of Guyuan (PL-City)	Zhongwei (PL-City)	established	State Council [2003]139
2003-12-31	↳ Zhongwei County	↳ Shapotou District	reorganized	State Council [2003]139
2003-12-31	↳ Huinong County	↳ Huinong District	reorganized	State Council [2003]139
2003-12-31	↳ Shizuishan District	↳ Huinong District	merged into	State Council [2003]139
2003-12-31	Taole County	Pingluo County	disestablished & merged into	State Council [2003]139
2003-12-31	parts of Shizuishan (PL-City)	Yinchuan (PL-City)	transferred & merged into	State Council [2003]139
2003-12-31	↳ parts of Taole County	↳ Xingqing District	transferred	State Council [2003]139
2009-09-30	parts of Tongxin County	Hongsibu District	established	State Council [2009]122

== Population composition ==
=== Prefectures ===
Prefecture	2010	2000
Yinchuan	1,993,088	1,399,447
Shizuishan	725,482	691,116
Wuzhong	1,273,792	1,118,877
Zhongwei	1,080,832	967,938
Guyuan	1,228,156	1,287,738

=== Counties ===
Name	Prefecture	2010
Xingqing	Yinchuan	678,306
Xixia	Yinchuan	329,310
Jinfeng	Yinchuan	282,554
Yongning	Yinchuan	218,260
Helan	Yinchuan	222,981
Lingwu	Yinchuan	261,677
Dawukou	Shizuishan	286,669
Huinong	Shizuishan	185,803
Pingluo	Shizuishan	253,010
Litong	Wuzhong	379,346
Hongsibu	Wuzhong	165,016
Yanchi	Wuzhong	146,560
Tongxin	Wuzhong	318,153
Qingtongxia	Wuzhong	264,717
Yuanzhou	Guyuan	411,854
Xiji	Guyuan	354,321
Longde	Guyuan	160,754
Jingyuan	Guyuan	101,026
Pengyang	Guyuan	200,201
Shapotou	Zhongwei	378,606
Zhongning	Zhongwei	312,921
Haiyuan	Zhongwei	389,305
