= Xihaigu =

Southern half of Ningxia Autonomous Region, China

Xihaigu 西海固
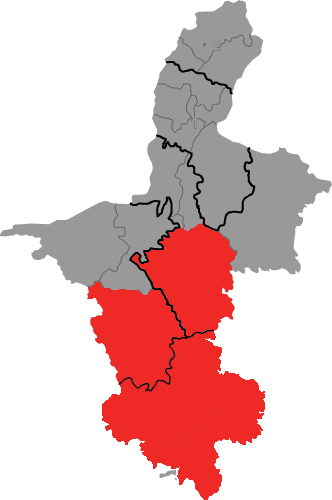
- Location of Xihaigu in Ningxia
- Country: China
- Region: Ningxia

Xihaigu is a region forming the southern tip of Ningxia, China. It consists of the seven county-level divisions Yuanzhou, Xiji, Longde, Jingyuan, Pengyang, Haiyuan and Tongxin. The former five counties being part of Guyuan city. It forms one of the poorest areas in China. The name derives from the names of Xiji, Haiyuan and Guyuan. In 2014 around half of the population belonged to the Hui minority, compared to overall 35.7% in all of Ningxia province.

== Ecology ==
In the 1970s, Xihaigu was named one of the "most unfit place for human settlement" by the World Food Programme due to its fragile ecology and vulnerability for droughts. Due to climate change, destruction of forests during the Tang and Ming dynasty and later intensive farming and rapid population growth resulting in overpopulation, the area was transformed from fertile grounds to arid land. Forests that would retain water for dry periods had disappeared. In the past decades the average temperature had risen while precipitation decreased. Local reservoirs and wells suffered salinisation.

Meanwhile the region's population had quadrupled between 1947 and 1997. Together this resulted in the amount of arable land per head to decrease accordingly.

== Resettlement ==
The Chinese government funds water conservation technology and ecological restoration. Since 1983, there have been several rounds of forced relocation of settlements away from ecologically sensitive areas. At the time, 95% of the region's population were peasants. Initially, residents were relocated to nearby places within the region with better conditions for farming. Due to lack of suitable land, residents were later relocated on a voluntary basis to places further north close the Yellow River and to the cities of Yinchuan and Shizuishan which had better existing infrastructure. New villages were erected for the relocated residents. To speed up the relocation process, in the past decades, entire villages have been relocated with the old homes being razed to prevent them from returning.

Although successful in reversing the ecological degradation of the region and improving the economic conditions of relocated residents, some residents were unable to adapt but were prevented to return. The resettlement of often ethnically homogeneous Hui villages has led to ethnic disputes, such as with Han people around the consumption of pork and between followers of different Menhuan who had lived in their distinct villages before relocation. However, overall, research has found relocated residents to be happier with their life after resettlement.

== See also ==
- Dingxi, a nearby region with similar issues
