= Guyuan (disambiguation) =

Guyuan (固原市) is a prefecture-level city in Ningxia, China.

Guyuan may also refer to:

- Guyuan County, Hebei (沽源县), in Zhangjiakou, Hebei
- Yuanzhou District, Guyuan, formerly known as "Guyuan County" (固原县), district of present-day Guyuan, Ningxia
