= Xihuayuan Subdistrict =

Xihuayuan Subdistrict (simplified Chinese: 西花园街道; traditional Chinese: 西花園街道) may refer to these subdistricts in China:

- Xihuayuan Subdistrict, Yinchuan, in Xixia District, Yinchuan, Ningxia
- Xihuayuan Subdistrict, Datong, in Yungang District, Datong, Shanxi
