= Xingjing, Ningxia =

Xingjing 兴泾镇 ثٍْ‌ڭٍْ جٍ
- Town
- Location in Ningxia
- Coordinates: 38°26′34″N 106°16′43″E
- Country: People's Republic of China
- Autonomous region: Ningxia
- Prefecture-level city: Yinchuan
- District: Xixia District
- Time zone: UTC+8 (China Standard)

Xingjing (simplified Chinese: 兴泾; traditional Chinese: 興涇; pinyin: Xīngjīng, Xiao'erjing: ثٍْ‌ڭٍْ جٍ) is a town under the administration of Xixia District, Yinchuan, Ningxia, China. As of 2018, it has 3 residential communities and 6 villages under its administration.
