= Hechuan Township =

Hechuan Township 河川乡
- Township
- Location in Ningxia
- Coordinates: 35°59′35″N 106°26′1″E
- Country: People's Republic of China
- Autonomous region: Ningxia
- Prefecture-level city: Guyuan
- District: Yuanzhou District
- Time zone: UTC+8 (China Standard)

Hechuan Township (simplified Chinese: 河川乡; traditional Chinese: 河川鄉; pinyin: Héchuān Xiāng) is a township under the administration of Yuanzhou District, Guyuan, Ningxia, China. As of 2020, it has ten villages under its administration:

- Haiping Village (海坪村)
- Kanggou Village (康沟村)
- Zhaiwa Village (寨洼村)
- Shangtai Village (上台村)
- Mingchuan Village (明川村)
- Luotuohe Village (骆驼河村)
- Huanghe Village (黄河村)
- Shangping Village (上坪村)
- Shanghuang Village (上黄村)
- Mujiagou Village (母家沟村)
