= Zhangyi =

Zhangyi 张易镇
- Town
- Location in Ningxia
- Coordinates: 35°48′57″N 106°5′32″E
- Country: People's Republic of China
- Autonomous region: Ningxia
- Prefecture-level city: Guyuan
- District: Yuanzhou District
- Time zone: UTC+8 (China Standard)

Zhangyi (Chinese: 张易; pinyin: Zhāngyì) is a town under the administration of Yuanzhou District, Guyuan, Ningxia, China. As of 2020, it administers the following 15 villages:

- Zhangyi Village
- Maozhuang Village (毛庄村)
- Hetao Village (贺套村)
- Tianpu Village (田堡村)
- Yanguan Village (闫关村)
- Huangpu Village (黄堡村)
- Nanwan Village (南湾村)
- Shangmaquan Village (上马泉村)
- Yanni Village (盐泥村)
- Chengou Village (陈沟村)
- Dadian Village (大店村)
- Machang Village (马场村)
- Tuoxiang Village (驼巷村)
- Songwa Village (宋洼村)
- Hongzhuang Village (红庄村)
