= Zhang Xianliang =

Chinese author and poet (1936–2014)

- Born: 8 December 1936 Nanking, Republic of China (1912-49)
- Died: 27 September 2014 (aged 77) Yinchuan, Ningxia, China
- Occupation: novelist, essayist, and poet

Zhang Xianliang (Chinese: 张贤亮; December 1936 – 27 September 2014) was a Chinese novelist, essayist, and poet, and former president of the Chinese Writers Association in Ningxia. He was detained as a political prisoner during the Anti-Rightist Movement in 1957, until his political rehabilitation in 1979. His most well known works, including Half of Man is Woman and Grass Soup, were semi-autobiographical reflections on his life experiences in prison and in witnessing the political upheaval of China during the Cultural Revolution.

== Life ==
Zhang Xianliang was born in 1936 into an upper-middle-class family in Nanjing, then the capital of the Republic of China. His father was a Kuomintang official and industrialist who managed a number of companies. Following the Communist victory in the Chinese Civil War, Zhang's father was accused of espionage, and later died in prison.

Zhang began publishing poetry at the age of 13. During the Anti-Rightist Movement, his poetry was criticized as counter-revolutionary, and Zhang was sent to a labor camp in Ningxia at age 21. He was subsequently detained several more times, and ultimately spent 22 years in prisons and labor camps. During the events of the Tiananmen Square protests of 1989, he expressed sympathy with the protesting students, resulting in the ban of his work Getting Used to Dying until 1993.

After his release from prison, Zhang served as a member of the National Committee of the Chinese People's Political Consultative Conference, and in 1992 he founded the West China Film Studio in Zhenbeibu, Ningxia, a former Qing Dynasty fort. The studio has served as the shooting location for several films such as Ashes of Time and A Chinese Odyssey. He died on 27 September 2014.

== Works ==
- Mimosa (1985) - English translation (Panda Books, 1985)
- Grass Soup (1995) - English translation by Martha Avery (David R. Godine, 1995)
- Half of Man is Woman (1985) - English translation by Martha Avery (Viking, 1988)
- Getting Used to Dying (1991) - English translation by Martha Avery (Flamingo, 1991)
- My Bodhi Tree (1994) - English translation by Martha Avery (Secker and Warburg, 1996)
