= Xixia, Yinchuan =

Xixia 西夏区 ثِ‌ثِيَا ٿِيُوِ
- County
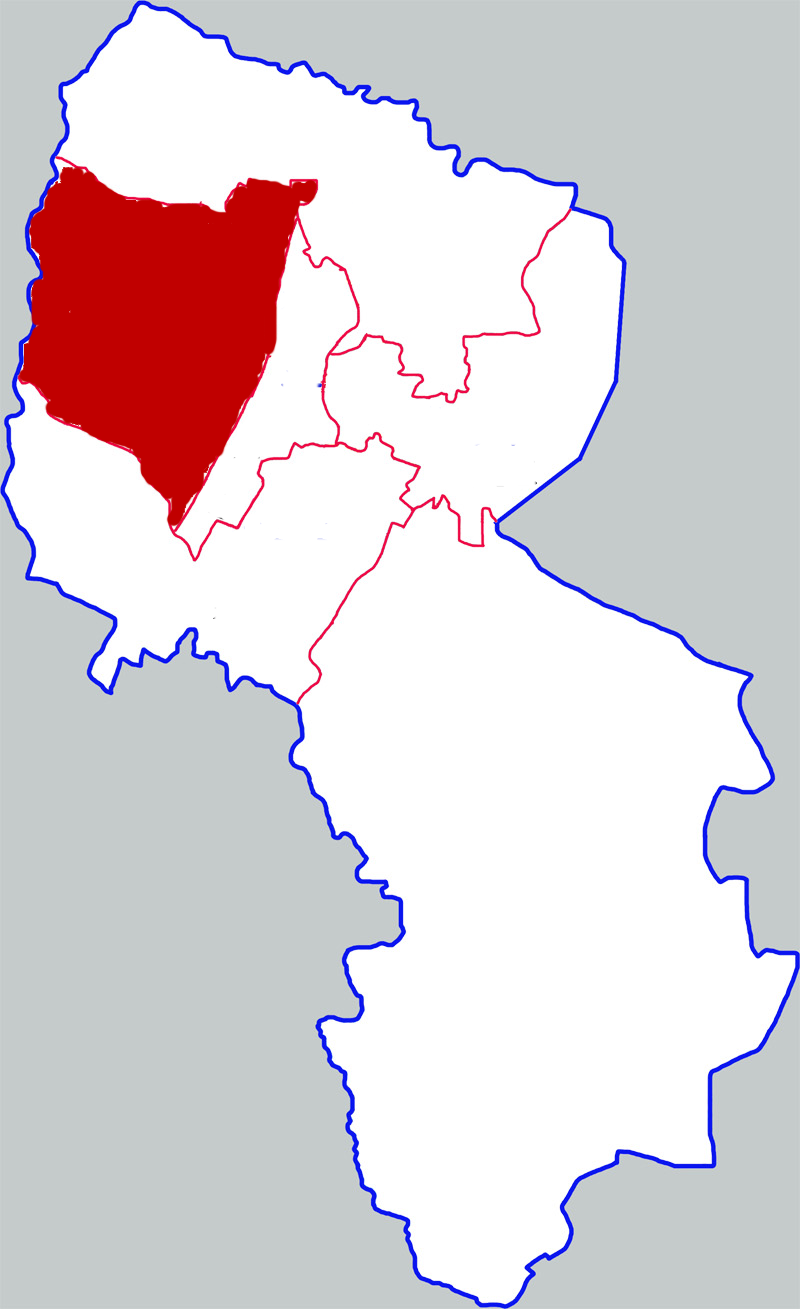
- Xixia in Yinchuan

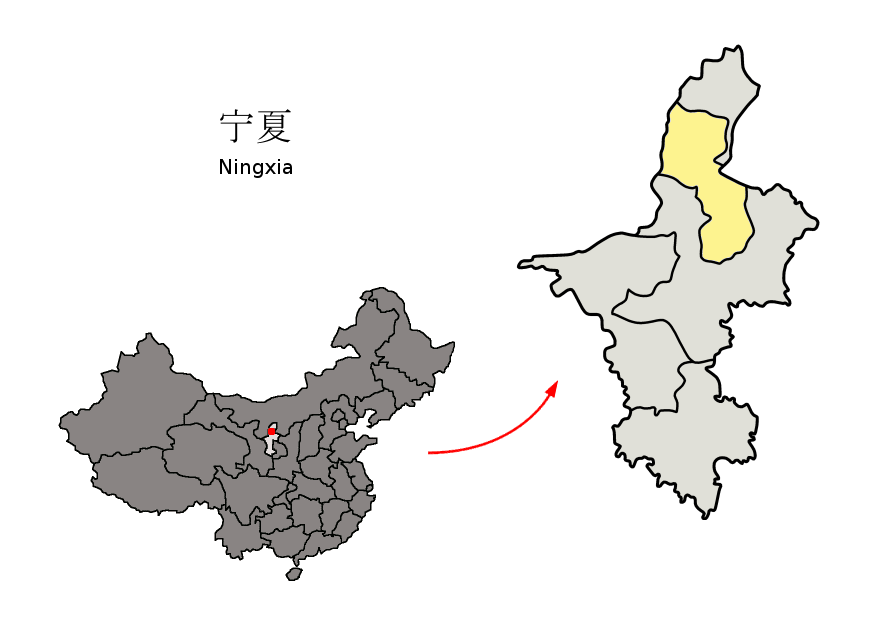
- Yinchuan in Ningxia
- Coordinates: 38°30′09″N 106°09′41″E
- Country: China
- Autonomous region: Ningxia
- Prefecture-level city: Yinchuan
- District seat: Xihuayuan

Area
  - Total: 883.84 km^{2} (341.25 sq mi)

Population
  - Total: 329,310
  - Density: 372.59/km^{2} (965.00/sq mi)
- Time zone: UTC+8 (China Standard)

Xixia District (simplified Chinese: 西夏区; traditional Chinese: 西夏區; pinyin: Xīxià Qū; Wade–Giles: Hsi-hsia Ch’ü; lit. 'West(ern) Xia district', Xiao'erjing: ثِ‌ثِيَا ٿِيُوِ) is one of three urban districts of the prefecture-level city of Yinchuan, the capital of Ningxia Hui Autonomous Region, Northwest China, bordering Inner Mongolia to the west. It has a total area of 987 km^{2} (381 sq mi), and a population of 200,000 people.

== Characteristics ==
Xixia District has seen rapid industrial development in recent years. However, it is a largely agricultural district, and at the same time that industry develops in the district, the cultivation of dairy cows and food crops has continued unabated. The district government is located on East Huaiyuan Road, and the district's postal code is 750021.

== Administrative divisions ==
Xixia District has 7 subdistricts and 2 towns.

7 subdistricts

- Xihuayuan (西花园街道)
- Huaiyuanlu (怀远路街道)
- Helanshanxilu (贺兰山西路街道, حَ‌لًا‌شًان ثِ لُ ڭِيَ‌دَوْ)
- Ninghualu (宁华路街道, نِئٍ‌خُوَا لُ ڭِيَ‌دَوْ)
- Shuofanglu (朔方路街道, شُوَفَانْ لُ ڭِيَ‌دَوْ)
- Wenchanglu (文昌路街道, وٌچَانْ لُ ڭِيَ‌دَوْ)
- Beijingxilu (北京西路街道, بِيْ‌ڭٍْ ثِ لُ ڭِيَ‌دَوْ)

2 towns

- Zhenbeibu (镇北堡镇, جٍ‌بِي‌بَوْ جٍ)
- Xingjing (兴泾镇, ثٍْ‌ڭٍْ جٍ)
