= Grass Soup =

Semi-autobiographical account of the life of Zhang Xianliang

The cover of the book

Grass Soup is a semi-autobiographical account of the life of Zhang Xianliang during his 22 years in prison in Mao's China.

== See also ==
- Anti-Rightist Campaign
- Cultural Revolution
