= Zhenbeibu =

Zhenbeibu 镇北堡镇 جٍ‌بِي‌بَوْ جٍ
- Town
- Location in Ningxia
- Coordinates: 38.6275°N 106.0669°E
- Country: People's Republic of China
- Autonomous region: Ningxia
- Prefecture-level city: Yinchuan
- District: Xixia District
- Time zone: UTC+8 (China Standard)

Zhenbeibu (simplified Chinese: 镇北堡; traditional Chinese: 鎮北堡; pinyin: Zhènběibǔ, Xiao'erjing: جٍ‌بِي‌بَوْ جٍ) is a town under the administration of Xixia District, Yinchuan, Ningxia, China. As of 2018, it has one residential community and 5 villages under its administration.
