= Xiji County =

Xiji 西吉县 ثِ‌ڭِ ثِيًا
- County
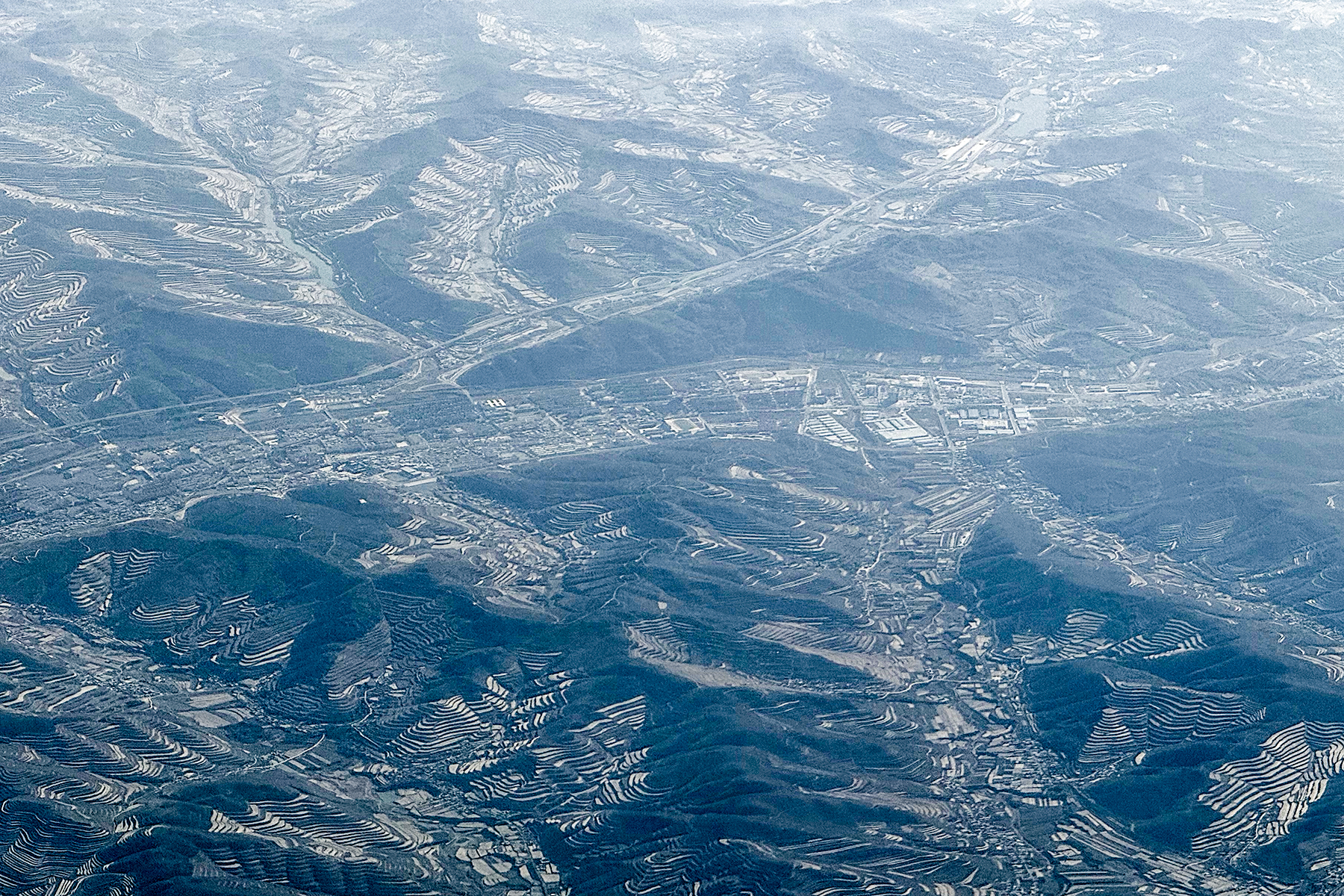
- Aerial photo of Xiji County

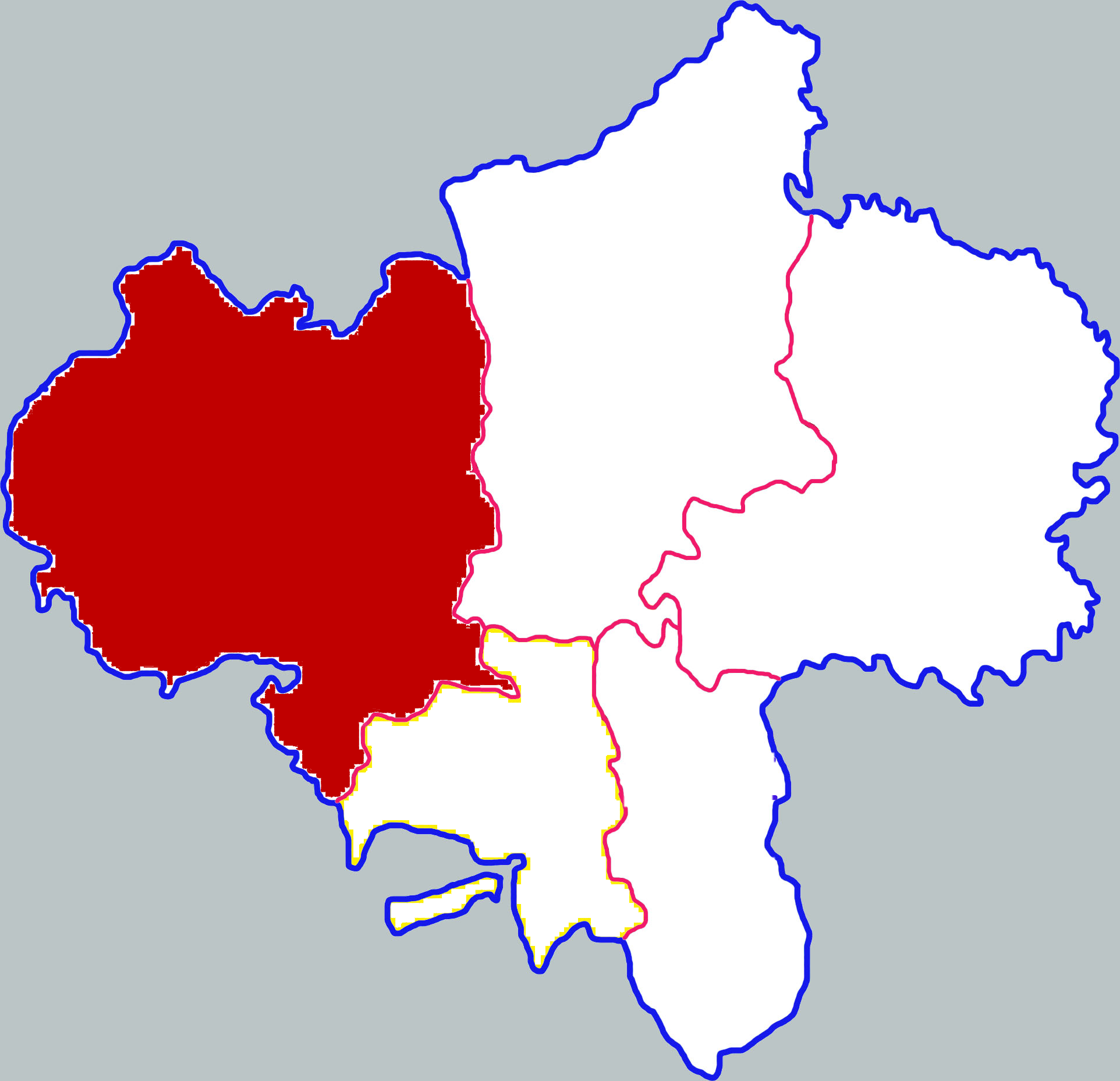
- Xiji in Guyuan

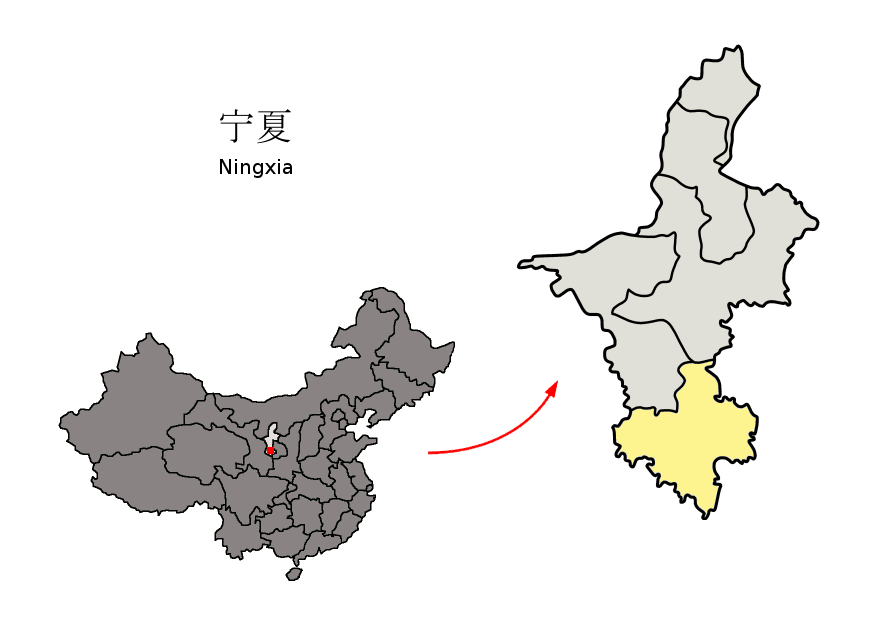
- Guyuan in Ningxia
- Coordinates: 35°58′06″N 105°43′02″E
- Country: China
- Autonomous region: Ningxia
- Prefecture-level city: Guyuan
- District seat: Jiqiang

Area
  - Total: 3,129.4 km^{2} (1,208.3 sq mi)

Population
  - Total: 354,321
  - Density: 113.22/km^{2} (293.25/sq mi)
- Time zone: UTC+8 (China Standard)

Xiji County (simplified Chinese: 西吉县; traditional Chinese: 西吉縣; pinyin: Xījí Xiàn, Xiao'erjing: ثِ‌ڭِ ثِيًا) is a county under the administration of the prefecture-level city of Guyuan in the southwest of the Ningxia Hui Autonomous Region of China, bordering Gansu province to the west. It has a total area of 3,985 km^{2} (1,539 sq mi), and a population of 480,800 people, including 263,000 Hui people.

== Characteristics ==
Xiji County is an agricultural county, and its main product are wheat, pea, potatoes, buckwheat, vegetables. Common vegetables grown include cabbage, Chinese cabbage, celery, tomatoes, chili peppers, cucumbers, garlic, and melons. The county government is located in the town of Jiqiang, and the district's postal code is 756200.

== Administrative divisions ==
Xiji County has 4 towns and 15 townships.

4 towns

- Jiqiang (吉强镇, ڭِ‌ٿِيَانْ چٍ)
- Pingfeng (平峰镇, پِئٍ‌فٍْ جٍ)
- Xinglong (兴隆镇, ثٍْ‌لْو جٍ)
- Jiangtaibu (将台堡镇)

15 townships

- Xinying (新营乡)
- Hongyao (红耀乡, خوْیَوْ ثِيَانْ)
- Tianping (田坪乡, تِيًاپِئٍ ثِيَانْ)
- Majian (马建乡, مَاڭِيًا ثِيَانْ)
- Zhenhu (震湖乡, جٍ‌خُ ثِيَانْ)
- Xingping (兴平乡, ثٍْ‌پِئٍ ثِيَانْ)
- Xitan (西滩乡, ثِ‌تًا ثِيَانْ)
- Wangmin (王民乡, وَانْ‌مٍ ثِيَانْ)
- Shizi (什字乡)
- Malian (马莲乡)
- Xiaohe (硝河乡)
- Piancheng (偏城乡)
- Shagou (沙沟乡)
- Baiya (白崖乡)
- Huoshizhai (火石寨乡)

== Climate ==
Climate data for Xiji, elevation 1,917 m (6,289 ft), (1991–2020 normals, extremes 1981–2010)
Month	Jan	Feb	Mar	Apr	May	Jun	Jul	Aug	Sep	Oct	Nov	Dec	Year
Record high °C (°F)	10.1 (50.2)	16.3 (61.3)	23.7 (74.7)	28.1 (82.6)	29.7 (85.5)	31.2 (88.2)	33.4 (92.1)	31.9 (89.4)	30.5 (86.9)	23.2 (73.8)	17.3 (63.1)	10.5 (50.9)	33.4 (92.1)
Mean daily maximum °C (°F)	−0.1 (31.8)	3.3 (37.9)	9.1 (48.4)	15.7 (60.3)	20.0 (68.0)	23.6 (74.5)	25.1 (77.2)	23.8 (74.8)	18.8 (65.8)	13.1 (55.6)	7.0 (44.6)	1.6 (34.9)	13.4 (56.2)
Daily mean °C (°F)	−8.2 (17.2)	−4.3 (24.3)	1.6 (34.9)	7.9 (46.2)	12.7 (54.9)	16.7 (62.1)	18.7 (65.7)	17.5 (63.5)	12.7 (54.9)	6.5 (43.7)	−0.3 (31.5)	−6.5 (20.3)	6.3 (43.3)
Mean daily minimum °C (°F)	−14.2 (6.4)	−10.0 (14.0)	−4.0 (24.8)	1.3 (34.3)	5.9 (42.6)	10.3 (50.5)	13.2 (55.8)	12.4 (54.3)	8.1 (46.6)	1.8 (35.2)	−5.3 (22.5)	−12.0 (10.4)	0.6 (33.1)
Record low °C (°F)	−29.0 (−20.2)	−26.2 (−15.2)	−19.1 (−2.4)	−9.4 (15.1)	−6.0 (21.2)	1.3 (34.3)	5.3 (41.5)	2.6 (36.7)	−2.1 (28.2)	−13.3 (8.1)	−18.7 (−1.7)	−32.0 (−25.6)	−32.0 (−25.6)
Average precipitation mm (inches)	3.3 (0.13)	5.0 (0.20)	9.4 (0.37)	22.2 (0.87)	39.9 (1.57)	59.6 (2.35)	82.2 (3.24)	87.3 (3.44)	54.3 (2.14)	31.9 (1.26)	7.9 (0.31)	1.7 (0.07)	404.7 (15.95)
Average precipitation days (≥ 0.1 mm)	4.2	4.5	5.8	6.6	9.2	10.4	12.4	11.7	11.1	8.8	4.6	2.4	91.7
Average snowy days	6.7	6.9	5.2	1.7	0.2	0	0	0	0	1.8	4.0	4.4	30.9
Average relative humidity (%)	63	62	57	53	56	62	71	74	76	74	68	64	65
Mean monthly sunshine hours	180.5	165.4	196.2	215.7	233.0	223.2	215.8	202.8	150.7	162.2	169.3	184.7	2,299.5
Percentage possible sunshine	58	53	52	55	53	51	49	49	41	47	56	61	52
Source: China Meteorological Administration
