= Pengyang County =

Pengyang 彭阳县 پٍْ‌يَانْ ثِيًا
- County
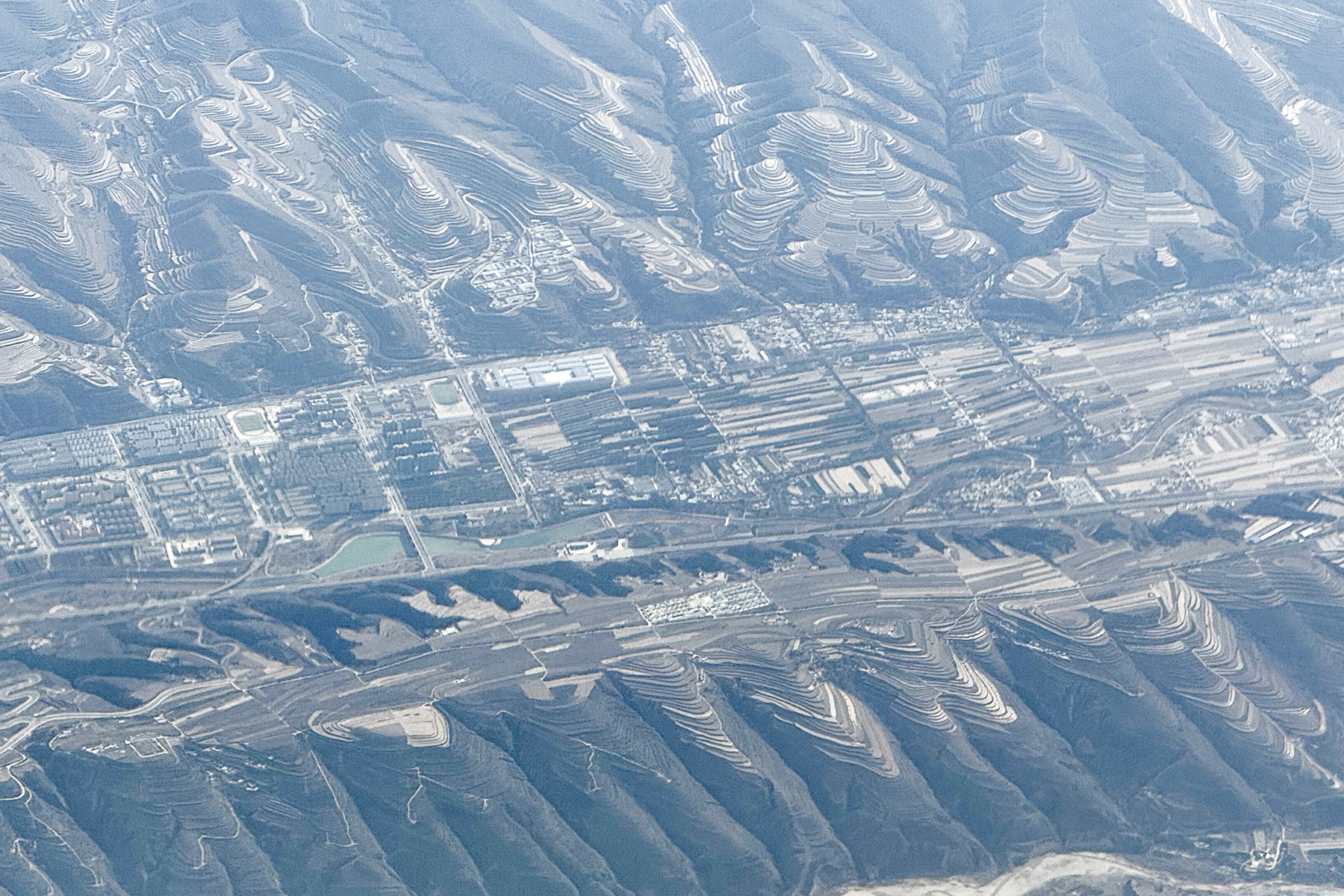
- Aerial photo

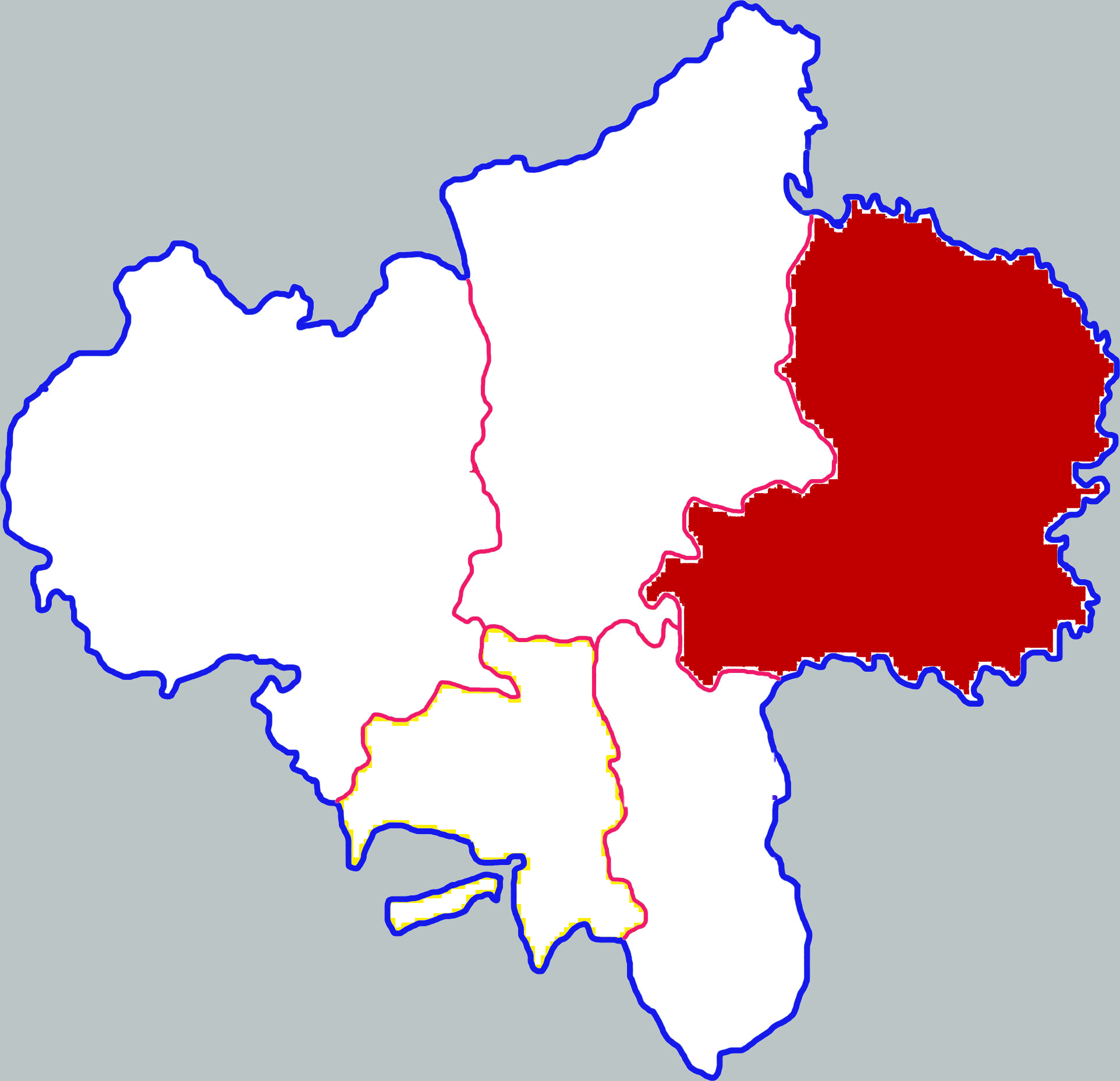
- Pengyang in Guyuan

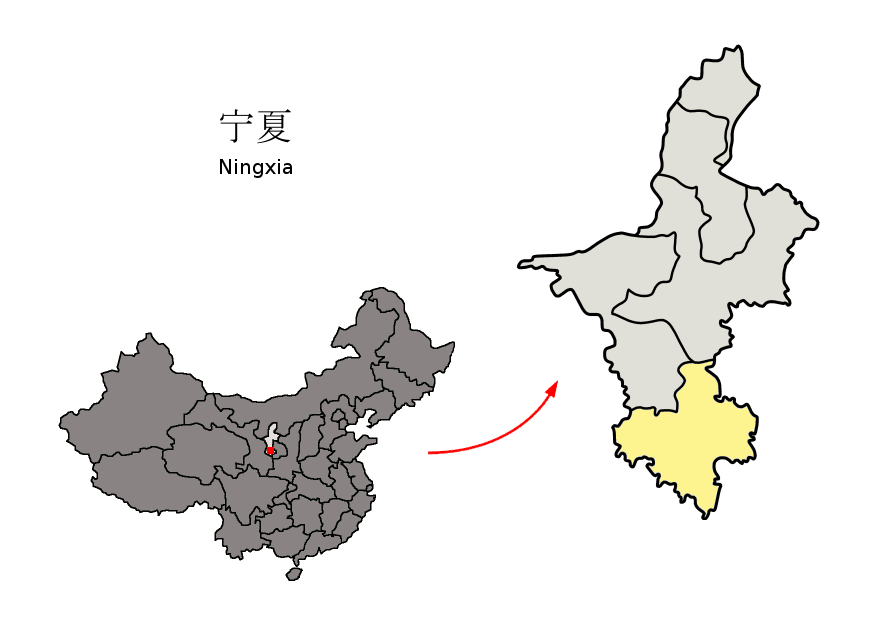
- Guyuan in Ningxia
- Coordinates: 35°51′32″N 106°37′54″E
- Country: China
- Autonomous region: Ningxia
- Prefecture-level city: Guyuan
- County seat: Baiyang

Area
  - Total: 2,533.49 km^{2} (978.19 sq mi)

Population
  - Total: 200,201
  - Density: 79.0218/km^{2} (204.666/sq mi)
- Time zone: UTC+8 (China Standard)

Pengyang County (simplified Chinese: 彭阳县; traditional Chinese: 彭陽縣; pinyin: Péngyáng Xiàn, Xiao'erjing:پٍْ‌يَانْ ثِيًا) is a county under the administration of the prefecture-level city of Guyuan in Ningxia Hui Autonomous Region of China, bordering Gansu province to the due north, east, and south. It has a total area of 3,241 km^{2} (1,251 sq mi), and a population of approximately 250,000 people.

== Characteristics ==
Pengyang County is an agricultural county. Its primary agricultural product is wheat, but in recent years the county has also developed forestry. In this it is a model county for Ningxia Hui Autonomous Region. The county government is located in the town of Baiyang, and the county's postal code is 756500. There are Hui people and Han people living together in this county. The population in the whole county is about 250,000. The Hui Chinese Muslim population is 80,000. The average temperature is between 7.4°C to 8.5°C. It is a dry area and also one of the State poverty counties where some people are still in poverty. Because of the bad weather and inconvenient location, it always gets financial aid from government. Most of the local people are farmers. As a small county, Pengyang is famous for Red plum apricots, ChaoNa chicken, Linseed oil, and dry apricot. there is a different living style from other places because of Hui Chinese Muslim and Han Chinese life styles.

== Administrative divisions ==
Pengyang County has 4 towns and 8 townships.

4 towns

- Baiyang (白阳镇, بَيْ‌يَانْ)
- Gucheng (古城镇, قُ‌چٍْ جٍ)
- Wangwa (王洼镇, وَانْ‌وَا جٍ)
- Honghe (红河镇)

8 townships

- Jiaocha (交岔乡, ڭِيَوْچَا ثِيَانْ)
- Luowa (罗洼乡, لُوَوَا ثِيَانْ)
- Mengyuan (孟塬乡, مٍْ‌يُوًا ثِيَانْ)
- Xiaocha (小岔乡, ثِيَوُچَا ثِيَانْ)
- Fengzhuang (冯庄乡, فٍْ‌جُوَانْ ثِيَانْ)
- Chengyang (城阳乡, چٍْ‌يَانْ ثِيَانْ)
- Xinji (新集乡, ثٍ‌ڭِ ثِيَانْ)
- Caomiao (草庙乡)

== Climate ==
Climate data for Pengyang, elevation 1,479 m (4,852 ft), (1991–2020 normals)
Month	Jan	Feb	Mar	Apr	May	Jun	Jul	Aug	Sep	Oct	Nov	Dec	Year
Mean daily maximum °C (°F)	1.8 (35.2)	5.5 (41.9)	12.0 (53.6)	18.4 (65.1)	22.6 (72.7)	26.0 (78.8)	27.3 (81.1)	25.6 (78.1)	20.0 (68.0)	15.2 (59.4)	9.1 (48.4)	3.6 (38.5)	15.6 (60.1)
Daily mean °C (°F)	−6.4 (20.5)	−2.5 (27.5)	4.2 (39.6)	10.5 (50.9)	15.1 (59.2)	19.2 (66.6)	21.0 (69.8)	19.6 (67.3)	14.3 (57.7)	8.3 (46.9)	1.6 (34.9)	−4.6 (23.7)	8.4 (47.1)
Mean daily minimum °C (°F)	−12.2 (10.0)	−8.4 (16.9)	−2.2 (28.0)	3.2 (37.8)	7.8 (46.0)	12.4 (54.3)	15.5 (59.9)	14.8 (58.6)	10.1 (50.2)	3.4 (38.1)	−3.5 (25.7)	−10.2 (13.6)	2.6 (36.6)
Average precipitation mm (inches)	4.6 (0.18)	7.6 (0.30)	13.1 (0.52)	30.9 (1.22)	52.6 (2.07)	58.1 (2.29)	94.7 (3.73)	108.2 (4.26)	85.5 (3.37)	37.2 (1.46)	11.1 (0.44)	1.6 (0.06)	505.2 (19.9)
Average precipitation days (≥ 0.1 mm)	4.4	4.9	6.2	6.9	8.4	9.4	11.9	12.0	12.2	9.6	5.0	1.8	92.7
Average snowy days	6.7	5.8	3.6	0.6	0	0	0	0	0	0.9	3.4	3.6	24.6
Average relative humidity (%)	56	58	55	51	55	61	69	74	79	75	67	59	63
Mean monthly sunshine hours	177.2	165.8	196.1	221.8	233.5	224.5	214.0	198.4	142.0	159.6	167.0	187.1	2,287
Percentage possible sunshine	57	54	52	56	53	52	49	48	39	46	55	62	52
Source: China Meteorological Administration
