= Xihuayuan Subdistrict, Yinchuan =

Xihuayuan Subdistrict 西花园街道
- Subdistrict
- Location in Ningxia
- Coordinates: 38°29′16″N 106°9′37″E
- Country: People's Republic of China
- Autonomous region: Ningxia
- Prefecture-level city: Yinchuan
- District: Xixia District
- Time zone: UTC+8 (China Standard)

Xihuayuan Subdistrict (simplified Chinese: 西花园街道; traditional Chinese: 西花園街道; pinyin: Xīhuāyuán Jiēdào) is a subdistrict in Xixia District, Yinchuan, Ningxia, China. As of 2018, it has 13 residential communities under its administration.

== See also ==
- List of township-level divisions of Ningxia
