= Yuanzhou, Guyuan =

Yuanzhou 原州区 ﻳُﻮًاﺟِﻮْ ٿِيُوِ
- District
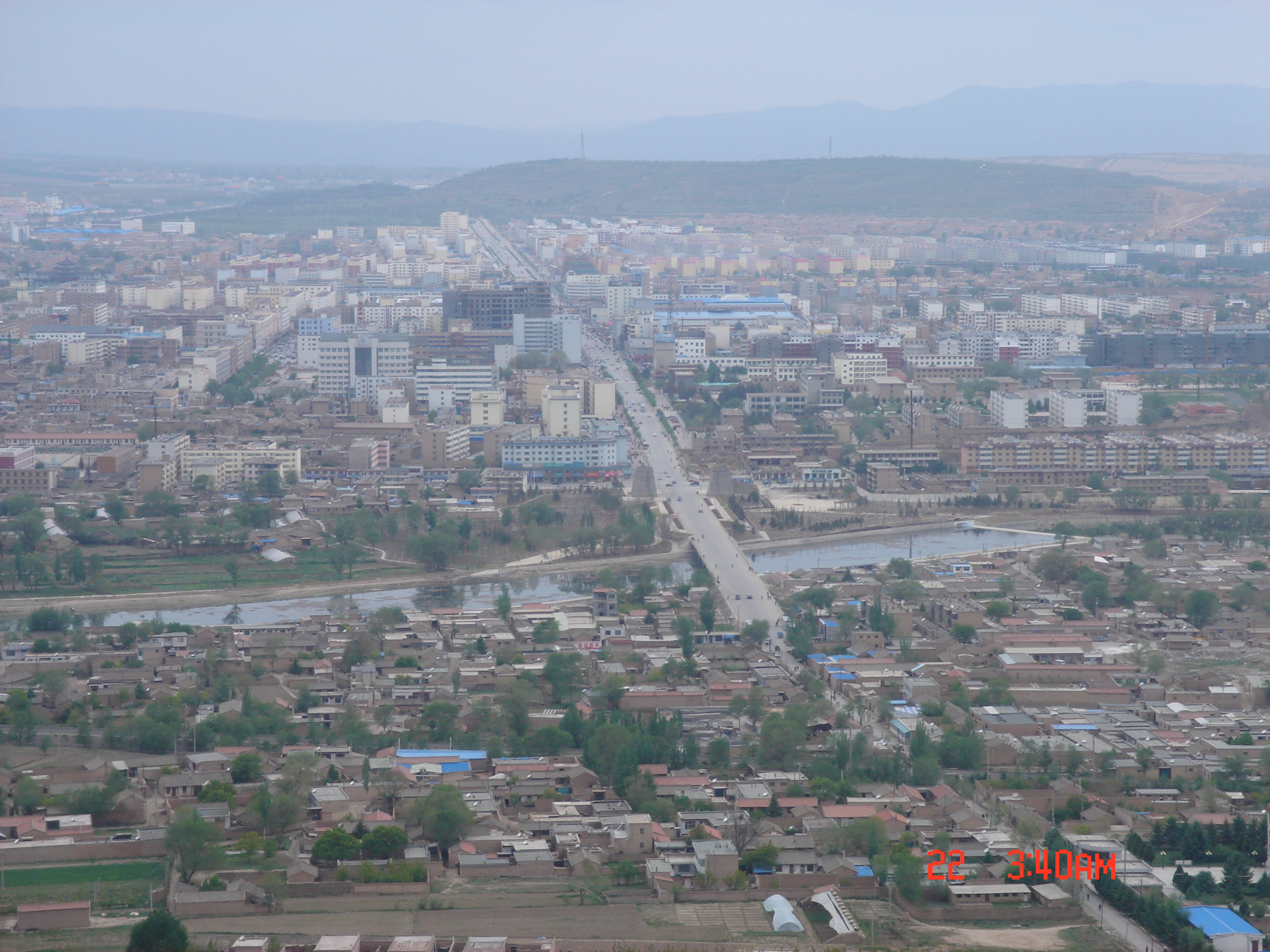
- Yuanzhou District in 2010

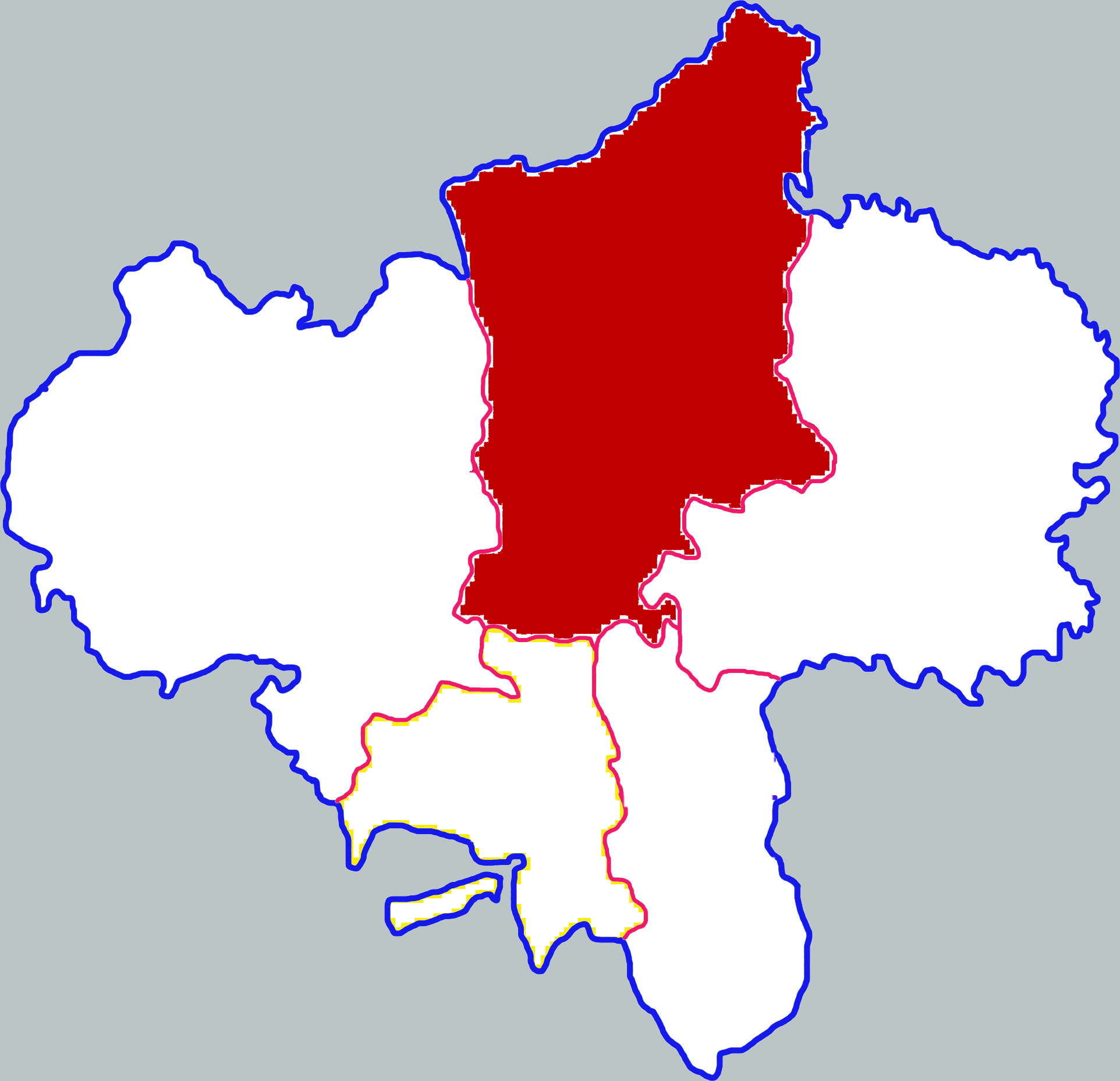
- Yuanzhou in Guyuan

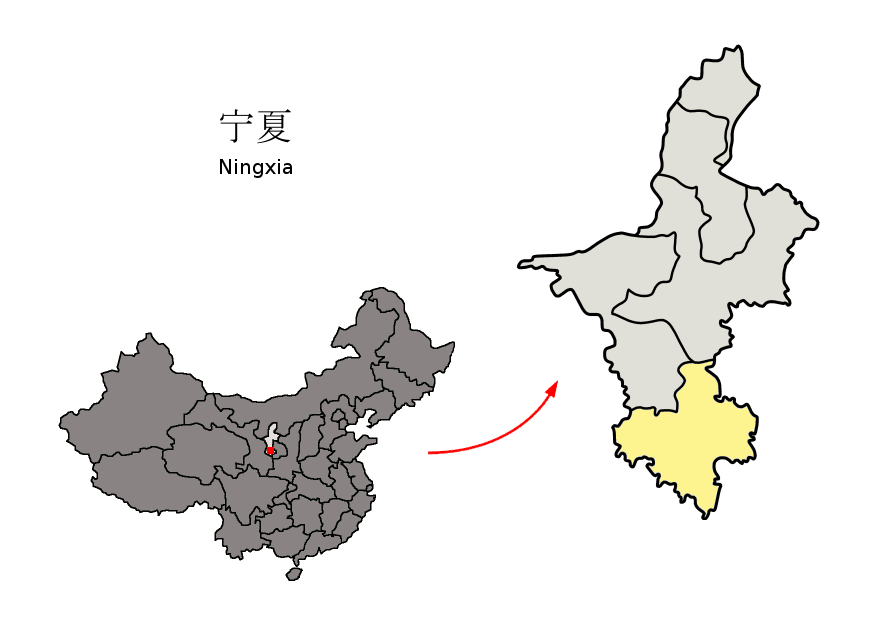
- Guyuan in Ningxia
- Coordinates (Yuanzhou government): 36°00′13″N 106°17′16″E
- Country: China
- Autonomous region: Ningxia
- Prefecture-level city: Guyuan
- District seat: Nanguan Subdistrict

Area
  - District: 2,739.01 km^{2} (1,057.54 sq mi)

Population (2020 census)
  - District: 471,329
  - Density: 172.080/km^{2} (445.685/sq mi)
  - Urban: 277,500
  - Rural: 199,200
- Time zone: UTC+8 (China Standard)
- Website: www.yzh.gov.cn

Yuanzhou, Guyuan
- Traditional Chinese: 原州區
- Simplified Chinese: 原州区
Transcriptions
Standard Mandarin
- Hanyu Pinyin: Yuánzhōu Qū
- Wade–Giles: Yüan-chou Ch’ü
other Mandarin
- Xiao'erjing: ﻳُﻮًاﺟِﻮْ ٿِيُوِ

Former names
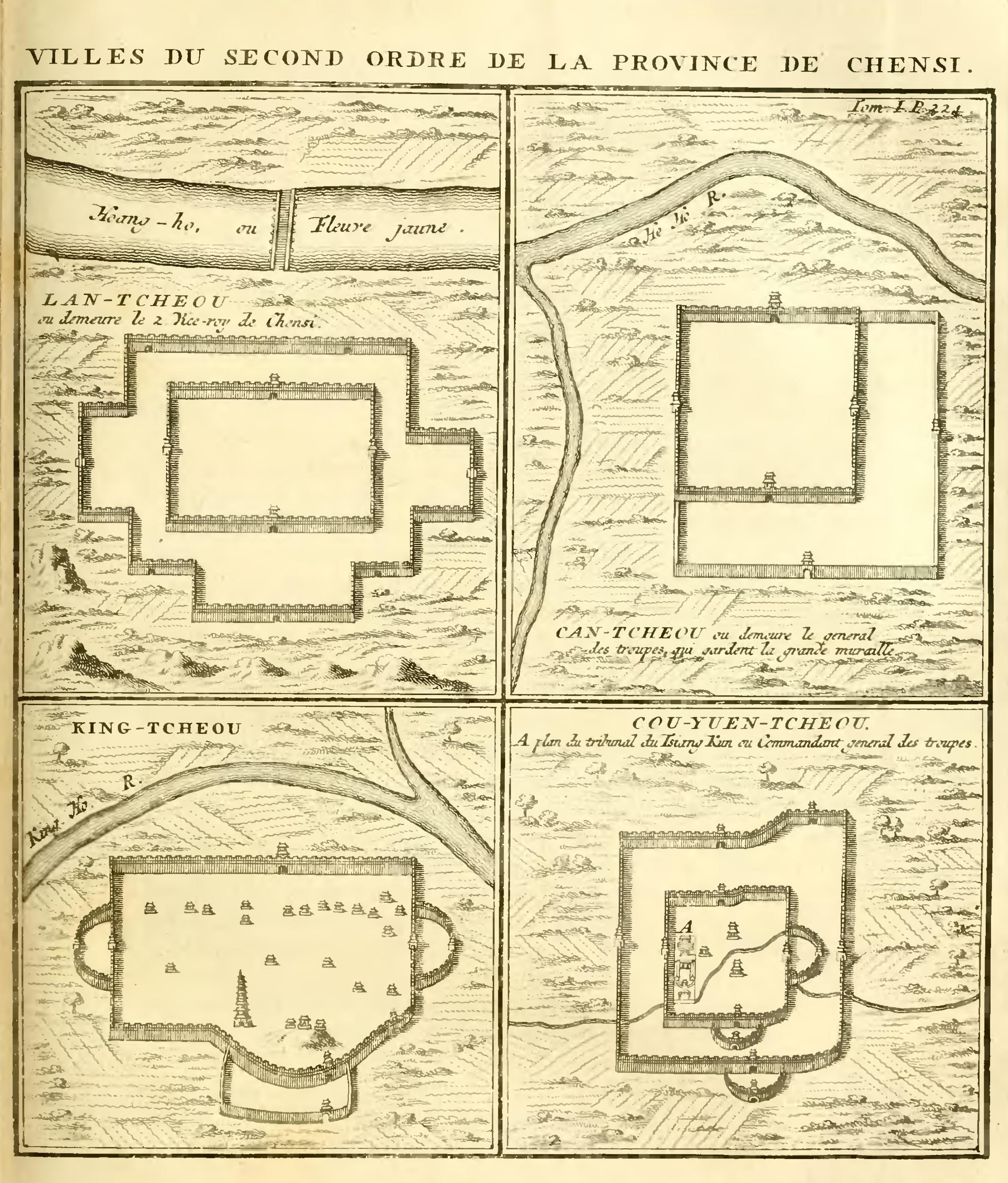
- "Cou-yuen-tcheou" and other "second-order" towns of Shaan-Gan, from Du Halde's 1736 Description of China, based on reports from Jesuit missionaries

Guyuan Prefecture
- Chinese: 固原州
Transcriptions
Standard Mandarin
- Hanyu Pinyin: Gùyuán Zhōu
- Wade–Giles: Ku-yüan Chou
other Mandarin
- Xiao'erjing: قُ‌يُوًا جِوْ

Guyuan County
- Traditional Chinese: 固原縣
- Simplified Chinese: 固原县
Transcriptions
Standard Mandarin
- Hanyu Pinyin: Gùyuán Xiàn
- Wade–Giles: Ku-yüan Hsien
other Mandarin
- Xiao'erjing: قُ‌يُوًا ثِيًا

Yuanzhou District, formerly Guyuan, is a district and the seat of the city of Guyuan in the south of Ningxia, China, bordering Gansu province to the northeast. It has a total area of 3,914 square kilometers (1,511 sq mi) and a population of 510,000 people.

Yuanzhou District is the economic, political, and transportation center of Guyuan. It includes the old town of Guyuan or Guyuanzhou, which administered a prefecture in imperial times and a county before its urbanization.

== History ==
Guyuan is the oldest city in Ningxia, being established in 114 BC as Gaoping, capital of Anding Commandery. It was a stop on the Northern Silk Road.

During the Warring States Period, Guyuan belonged to the territory of Qin state, later Qin Dynasty. The original name of the city began in the Ming dynasty (1452 AD). Because of the importance of its transportation in history, Guyuan was a war gate where Chinese soldiers trained and prepared to fight with northwestern minorities. In the Tang dynasty, most of the dealers from middle Asia need to go through this gate, then went to the capital, Chang'an.

According to the First Founder's Biography in History of Yuan Dynasty, Genghis Khan died in Liupan Mountain in Guyuan in 1227 AD, after a war with the Xixia dynasty for two decades.

Most remains of the ancient city, including a bell tower, were destroyed during the 1970s to build an air-raid shelter, with only parts of the old city wall remaining.

== Demographics ==
As of 2020 the population was 471,329. In 2022 the urbanization rate in the district was 58%.

Population composition
Ethnicity	Share
Han	50.45%
Hui	49.36%

== Administrative divisions ==
Yuanzhou District is divided into 3 subdistricts, 7 towns and 4 townships.

3 subdistricts

- Nanguan (南关街道, نًاقُوًا ڭِيَ‌دَوْ)
- Guyan (古雁街道)
- Beiyuan (北塬街道)

7 towns

- Sanying (三营镇, سًايٍ جٍ)
- Guanting (官厅镇)
- Kaicheng (开城镇, کَيْ‌چٍْ جٍ)
- Zhangyi (张易镇, جَانْ‌ءِ جٍ)
- Pengbu (彭堡镇, پٍْ‌بُ جٍ)
- Touying (头营镇, تِوْيٍ جٍ)
- Huangduobao (黄铎堡镇)

4 townships

- Zhonghe (中河乡, جْوحَ ثِيَانْ)
- Hechuan (河川乡, حَ‌چُوًان ثِيَانْ)
- Tanshan (炭山乡, تًاشًا ثِيَانْ)
- Zhaike (寨科乡, جَيْ‌کْ ثِيَانْ)
