= Guyuan =

Guyuan 固原市 · قُ‌يُوًا شِ Kuyuan; Kuyüan
- Prefecture-level city
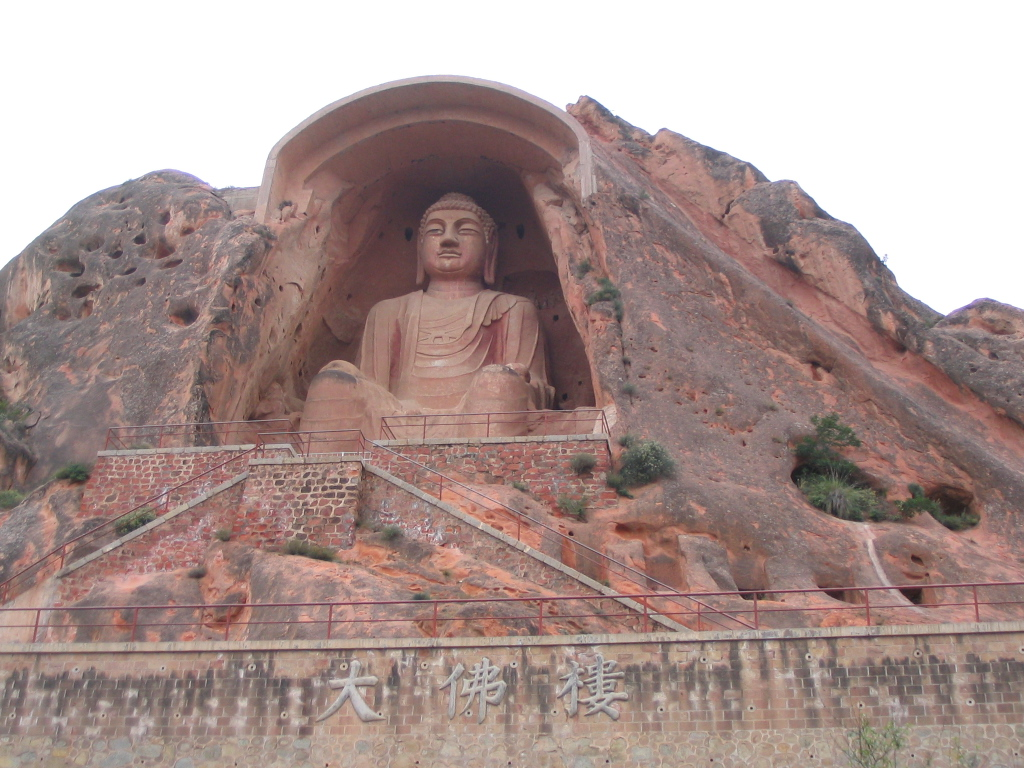
- Xumishan grottoes

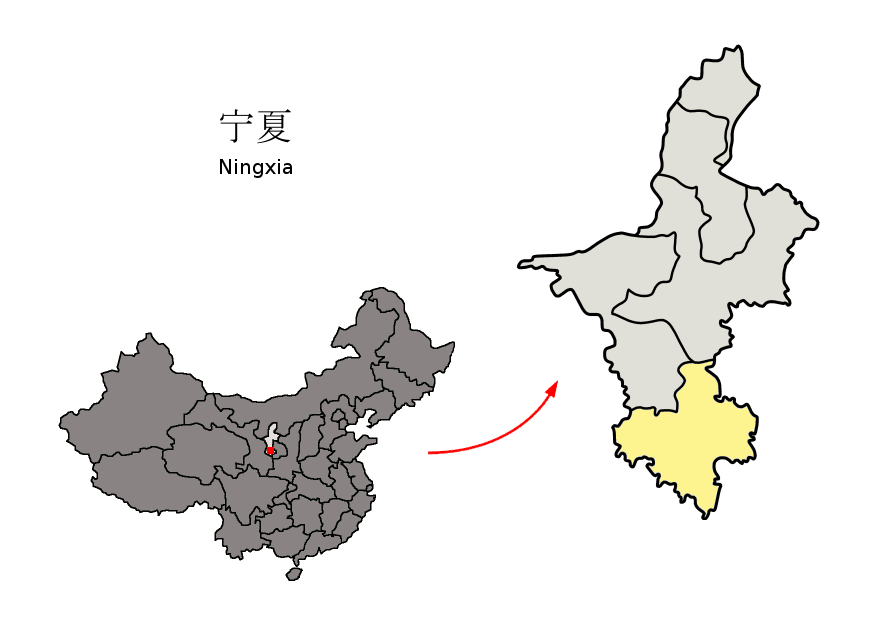
- Guyuan City (yellow) within Ningxia

- Location of the city center in Ningxia
- Coordinates (Zhongxin Park (中心公园)): 36°00′36″N 106°15′25″E
- Country: People's Republic of China
- Region: Ningxia
- Municipal seat: Yuanzhou District

Area
  - Total: 14,412.83 km^{2} (5,564.82 sq mi)
- Elevation: 1,777 m (5,830 ft)

Population (2007)
  - Total: 1,455,200
  - Density: 100.97/km^{2} (261.50/sq mi)

GDP (nominal) (2025)
  - Total: CN¥ 48.8 billion US$ 6.8 billion
  - Per capita: CN¥ 42,800; US$ 5,992
- Time zone: UTC+8 (China Standard)
- Postal code: 756000
- Area code: (0)954
- ISO 3166 code: CN-NX-04
- Licence plate prefixes: 宁D
- Website: www.nxgy.gov.cn

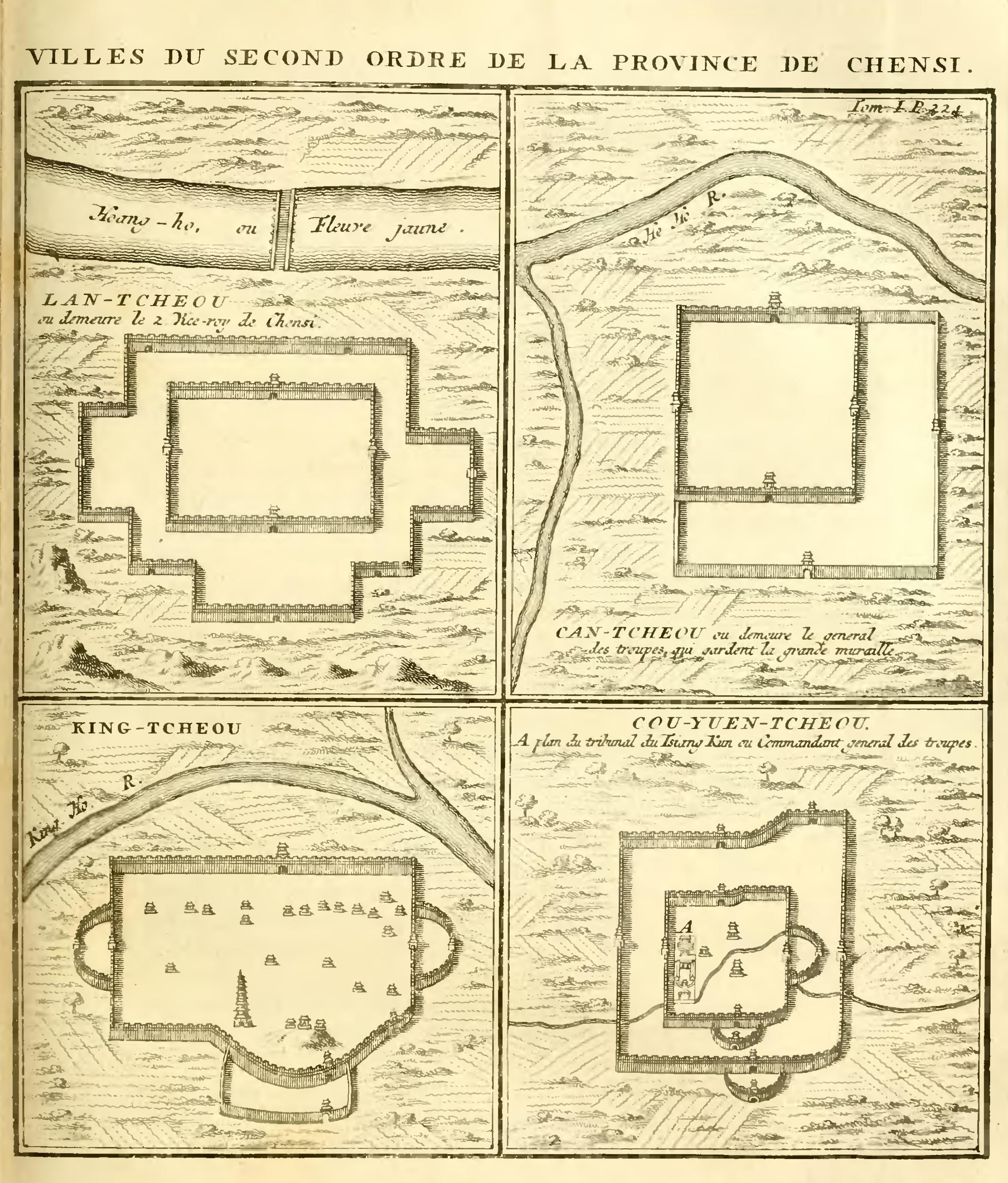
"Cou-yuen-tcheou" and other "second-order" towns of Shaan-Gan from Du Halde's 1736 Description of China, based on reports from Jesuit missionaries

Guyuan (Chinese: 固原; pinyin: Gùyuán), formerly known as Xihaigu (Chinese: 西海固; pinyin: xīhǎigù, Xiao'erjing: قُ‌يُوًا شِ) or Dayuan (大原), is a prefecture-level city in the Ningxia Hui Autonomous Region of the People's Republic of China. It occupies the southernmost section of the region, bordering Gansu province to the east, south, and due west. This is also the site of Mount Sumeru Grottoes (须弥山), which is among the ten most famous grottoes in China. As of the end of 2018, the total resident population in Guyuan was 1,124,200. At the end of 2024, the city's resident population was 1,140,800, a decrease of 6,900 compared with the end of the previous year. Among them, the resident population in urban areas was 535,600, accounting for 46.95% of the resident population (the urbanization rate of the resident population), an increase of 1.29 percentage points over the end of the previous year.

== History ==
Guyuan is the oldest city in Ningxia, being established in 114 BC as Gaoping, capital of Anding Commandery. It was a stop on the Northern Silk Road.

During the Warring States Period, Guyuan belonged to the territory of Qin state, later Qin Dynasty. The original name of the city began in the Ming dynasty (1452 AD). Because of the importance of its transportation in history, Guyuan was a war gate where Chinese soldiers trained and prepared to fight with northwestern minorities. In the Tang dynasty, most of the dealers from middle Asia need to go through this gate, then went to the capital, Chang'an.

According to the First Founder's Biography in History of Yuan Dynasty, Genghis Khan died in Liupan Mountain in Guyuan in 1227 AD, after a war with the Xixia dynasty for two decades.

Most remains of the ancient city, including a bell tower, were destroyed during the 1970s to build an air-raid shelter, with only parts of the old city wall remaining.

== Economy ==
As of 2025, Guyuan had a GDP of CN¥48.807 billion (US$6.833 billion) and a GDP per capita of CN¥42,800 (US$5,992).

== Liupanshan National Forest Park ==
Liupanshan National Forest Park is one of the most important features of Guyuan, with more than 530 species of wild medicinal plants. There are a number of diversified animals inhabited in the forest, for instance, the national first-class protected animal golden leopard, the third-class protected animal forest musk deer, golden eagle, and red-bellied golden pheasant.

== Administrative divisions ==
Map
Name	Hanzi	Hanyu Pinyin	Xiao'erjing	Population (2003 est.)	Area (km^{2})	Density (/km^{2})
Yuanzhou District	原州区	Yuánzhōu Qū	ﻳُﻮًاﺟِﻮْ ٿِيُوِ	490,000	4,965	99
Xiji County	西吉县	Xījí Xiàn	ثِ‌ڭِ ثِيًا	460,000	3,985	115
Longde County	隆德县	Lóngdé Xiàn	ﻟْﻮدْ ثِيًا	190,000	1,269	150
Jingyuan County	泾源县	Jīngyuán Xiàn	ڭٍْ‌يُوًا ثِيًا	120,000	961	125
Pengyang County	彭阳县	Péngyáng Xiàn	پٍْ‌يَانْ ثِيًا	250,000	3,241	77

== Geography and climate ==
Guyuan has a monsoon-influenced humid continental climate (Köppen Dwb), with long, cold, dry winters, and warm, rainier summers. With temperatures cooled by the elevation that exceeds 1,770 metres (5,810 ft), highs average slightly below freezing in January and reach only 25 °C (77 °F) in July. Much of the year's precipitation is delivered from June to September.

Climate data for Guyuan, elevation 1,836 m (6,024 ft), (1991–2020 normals, extremes 1971–2010)
Month	Jan	Feb	Mar	Apr	May	Jun	Jul	Aug	Sep	Oct	Nov	Dec	Year
Record high °C (°F)	15.1 (59.2)	20.7 (69.3)	24.5 (76.1)	30.1 (86.2)	31.5 (88.7)	32.3 (90.1)	34.6 (94.3)	33.8 (92.8)	31.5 (88.7)	24.8 (76.6)	20.4 (68.7)	14.4 (57.9)	34.6 (94.3)
Mean daily maximum °C (°F)	0.1 (32.2)	3.6 (38.5)	9.4 (48.9)	16.1 (61.0)	20.5 (68.9)	24.2 (75.6)	25.6 (78.1)	23.9 (75.0)	19.0 (66.2)	13.5 (56.3)	7.8 (46.0)	1.9 (35.4)	13.8 (56.8)
Daily mean °C (°F)	−6.9 (19.6)	−3.1 (26.4)	2.8 (37.0)	9.5 (49.1)	14.3 (57.7)	18.3 (64.9)	20.0 (68.0)	18.4 (65.1)	13.5 (56.3)	7.4 (45.3)	1.0 (33.8)	−5.1 (22.8)	7.5 (45.5)
Mean daily minimum °C (°F)	−12.0 (10.4)	−8.2 (17.2)	−2.5 (27.5)	3.4 (38.1)	8.0 (46.4)	12.4 (54.3)	14.6 (58.3)	13.6 (56.5)	9.0 (48.2)	2.7 (36.9)	−3.8 (25.2)	−10.0 (14.0)	2.3 (36.1)
Record low °C (°F)	−27.0 (−16.6)	−23.6 (−10.5)	−18.9 (−2.0)	−12.0 (10.4)	−6.4 (20.5)	0.1 (32.2)	4.0 (39.2)	3.1 (37.6)	−2.3 (27.9)	−11.2 (11.8)	−20.0 (−4.0)	−30.9 (−23.6)	−30.9 (−23.6)
Average precipitation mm (inches)	3.8 (0.15)	6.1 (0.24)	11.2 (0.44)	26.4 (1.04)	38.6 (1.52)	61.3 (2.41)	90.6 (3.57)	112.7 (4.44)	61.5 (2.42)	33.3 (1.31)	8.4 (0.33)	2.2 (0.09)	456.1 (17.96)
Average precipitation days (≥ 0.1 mm)	2.1	2.9	4.3	3.4	5.9	8.7	12.2	11.9	8.1	4.4	2.6	1.9	68.4
Average snowy days	6.8	7.2	6.2	2.2	0.3	0	0	0	0.1	2.2	4.7	4.6	34.3
Average relative humidity (%)	56	55	52	48	50	57	66	71	72	69	60	55	59
Mean monthly sunshine hours	198.9	185.5	213.3	230.8	247.2	241.3	238.2	222.6	174.0	189.8	197.8	207.5	2,546.9
Percentage possible sunshine	64	60	57	58	57	55	54	54	47	55	65	69	58
Source 1: China Meteorological Administration
Source 2: Weather China

== Transportation ==
The city is served by Guyuan Liupanshan Airport, though travelers may also choose Zhongwei Xiangshan Airport and Yinchuan Hedong International Airport as well. The G70 Fuzhou–Yinchuan Expressway passes through the area on its way to the regional capital of Yinchuan.

As there is no high-speed railways to Guyuan, one of the fastest ways to travel to Guyuan from a major city is an approximately 4-hour drive from Yinchuan, which is actually faster than traveling by train, which takes at least 5 hours.
