= Xiao'erjing =

Writing system for Chinese in the Perso-Arabic script

Xiao'erjing ثِیَوْعَرݣٍْ
- Script type: Abugida
- Period: c. 14th century CE – present
- Direction: Right-to-left
- Languages: Chinese

Related scripts
- Parent systems: Egyptian hieroglyphs: Proto-Sinaitic; Phoenician; Aramaic; Nabataean; Arabic; Persian; Xiao'erjing

Xiao'erjing
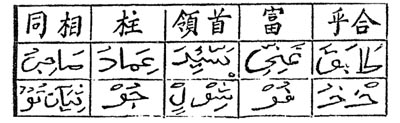
- A Chinese–Arabic–Xiao'erjing dictionary
- Traditional Chinese: 小兒經
- Simplified Chinese: 小儿经
- Xiao'erjing: ثِیَوْعَرݣ‌ٍْ
- Literal meaning: children's script
Transcriptions
Standard Mandarin
- Hanyu Pinyin: Xiǎo'érjīng
- IPA: [ɕjàʊ.ǎɚ.tɕíŋ]
other Mandarin
- Xiao'erjing: ثِیَوْعَرݣ‌ٍْ
- Dungan: Щёрҗин
Yue: Cantonese
- Hong Kong Romanisation: Siu Yi Keng

Xiaojing
- Traditional Chinese: 小經
- Simplified Chinese: 小经
- Literal meaning: minor script
Transcriptions
Standard Mandarin
- Hanyu Pinyin: Xiǎojīng

Xiaojing
- Traditional Chinese: 消經
- Simplified Chinese: 消经
- Xiao'erjing: ثِیَوْݣ‌ٍْ
- Literal meaning: revised script
Transcriptions
Standard Mandarin
- Hanyu Pinyin: Xiāojīng
other Mandarin
- Xiao'erjing: ثِیَوْݣ‌ٍْ

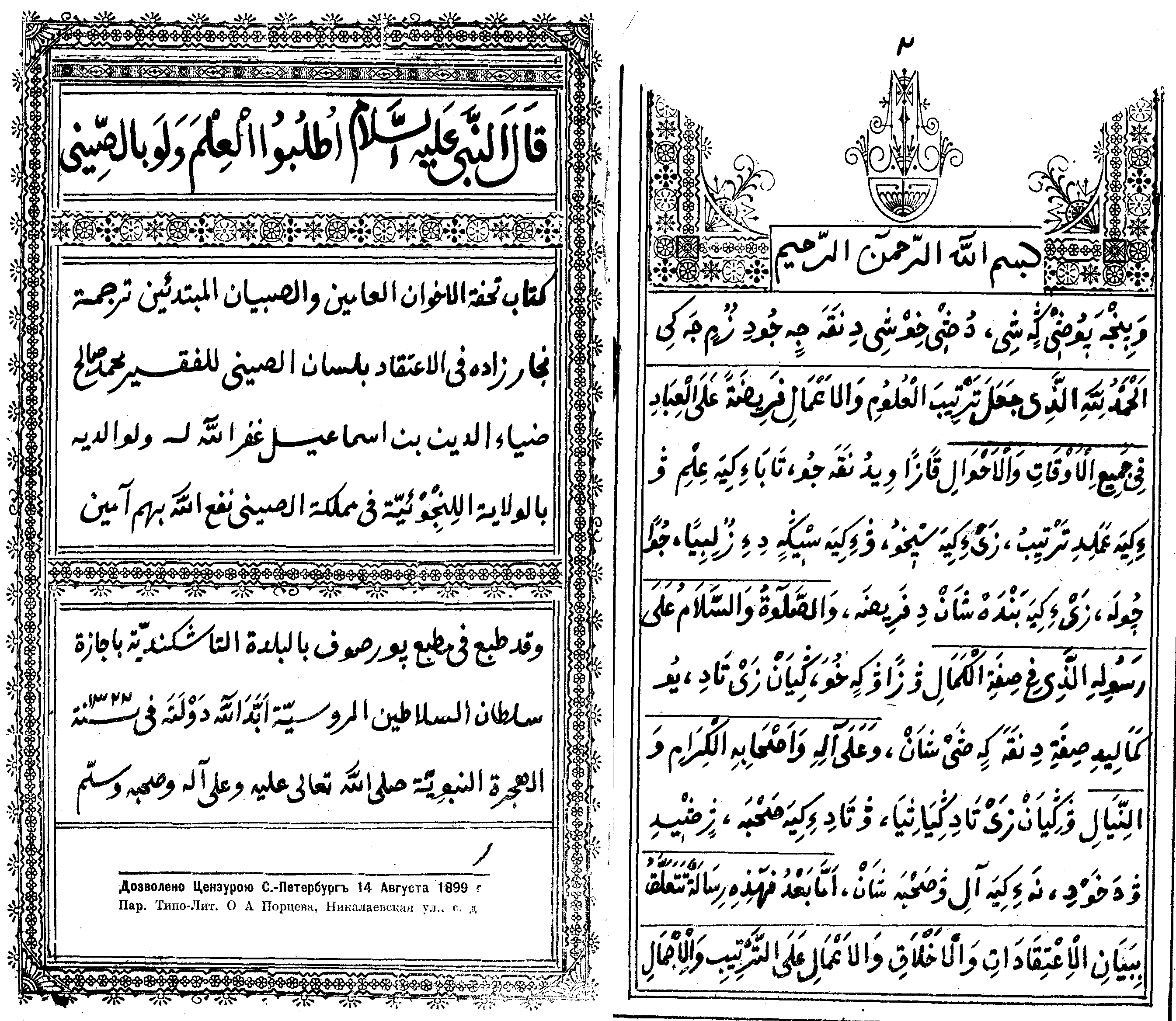
A book on law in Arabic, with a parallel Chinese translation in the Xiao'erjing script, published in Tashkent in 1899. The page on the left side shows the book information in Arabic. The page on the right has mixed lines of Arabic—marked by a continuous black line on top—and their Chinese translation in Xiao'erjing script, that follow the Arabic original on the same line.

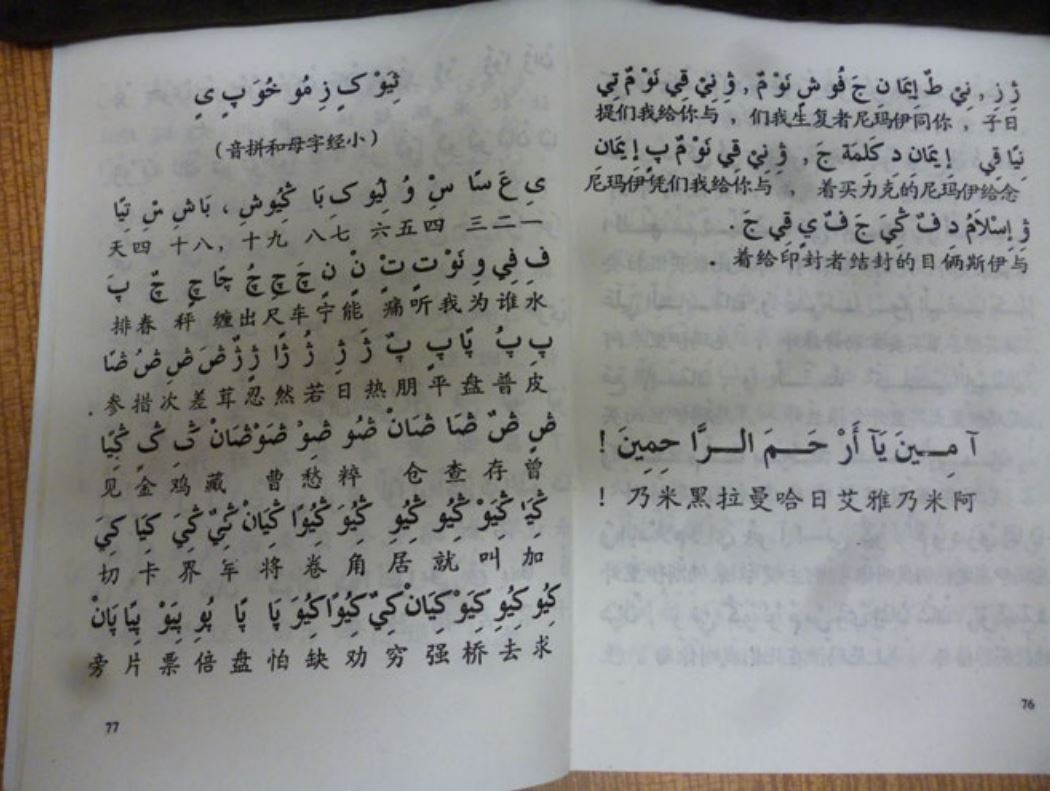
Pages from a Book titled "Questions and Answers on the Faith in Islam", Published in Xining, which includes a Xiao'erjing–Hanzi transliteration chart, as well a paragraph that includes Arabic loanwords

Xiao'erjing, (Note: English: /ˌʃjaʊˌɜːrˈdʒɪŋ/; simplified Chinese: 小儿经; traditional Chinese: 小兒經; pinyin: Xiǎo'érjīng; lit. 'children's script') Xiaorjing, Xiaojing (Note: simplified Chinese: 小经; traditional Chinese: 小經; pinyin: Xiǎojīng; lit. 'minor script') (Note: simplified Chinese: 消经; traditional Chinese: 消經; pinyin: Xiāojīng; lit. 'revised script') or Benjing, (Note: simplified Chinese: 本经; traditional Chinese: 本經; pinyin: Běnjīng; Xiao'erjing: بٌ‌ݣْ‌ٍ; Dungan: Бынҗин; lit. 'original script' (being the Perso-Arabic script)) is a Perso-Arabic script used to write Sinitic languages, including Lanyin Mandarin, Zhongyuan Mandarin, Northeastern Mandarin, and Dungan. It is used on occasion by many ethnic minorities who adhere to Islam in China—mostly the Hui, but also the Dongxiang and the Salar—and formerly by their Dungan descendants in Central Asia. Orthographic reforms introduced the Latin script and later the Cyrillic script to the Dungan language, which continue to be used today.

Xiao'erjing is written from right to left, like other Perso-Arabic writing systems.

Xiao'erjing is unusual among Arabic script-based writing systems in that all vowels, long and short, are explicitly notated with diacritics, making it an abugida. Some other Arabic-based writing systems in China, such as the Uyghur Arabic alphabet, use letters and not diacritics to mark short vowels.

== Nomenclature ==
Xiao'erjing does not have a single, standard name. In Shanxi, Hebei, Henan, Shandong, and eastern Shaanxi, as well as also Beijing, Tianjin and the northeastern provinces, the script is referred to as Xiǎo'érjīng, which when shortened becomes Xiǎojīng or Xiāojīng (the latter Xiāo has the meaning of "to review" in the aforementioned regions). In Ningxia, Gansu, Inner Mongolia, Qinghai, western Shaanxi and the northwestern provinces, the script is referred to as Xiǎo'érjǐn. The Dongxiang people refer to it as the "Dongxiang script" or the "Huihui script"; The Salar refer to it as the "Salar script"; The Dungan of Central Asia used a variation of Xiao'erjing called the "Hui script", before being made to abandon the Arabic script for Latin and Cyrillic. According to A. Kalimov, a famous Dungan linguist, the Dungan of the former Soviet Union called this script щёҗин (şjoⱬin, 消經).

== Origins ==
Since the arrival of Islam in Tang dynasty China beginning in the mid-7th century, many Arabic and Persian speaking people migrated into China. Centuries later, these peoples assimilated with the native Han Chinese, forming the Hui ethnicity of today. Many Chinese Muslim students attended madrasas to study Classical Arabic and the Qur'an. Because these students had a very basic understanding of Chinese characters but would have a better command of the spoken tongue once assimilated, they started using the Arabic script for Chinese. This was often done by writing notes in Chinese to aid in the memorization of suras. This method was also used to write Chinese translations of Arabic vocabulary learned in the madrasas. Thus, a system of writing the Chinese language with Arabic script gradually developed and standardized to some extent. Currently, the oldest known artifact showing signs of Xiao'erjing is a stone stele in the courtyard of Daxue Xixiang Mosque in Xi'an. The stele shows inscribed Qur'anic verses in Arabic as well as a short note of the names of the inscribers in Xiao'erjing. The stele was done in the year AH 740 in the Islamic calendar (between July 9, 1339, and June 26, 1340). Some old Xiao'erjing manuscripts (along with other rare texts including those from Dunhuang) are preserved in the Institute of Oriental Manuscripts of the Russian Academy of Sciences in St. Petersburg, Russia.

== Usage ==
Xiao'erjing can be divided into two sets, the "Mosque system" and the "Daily system". The "Mosque system" is the system used by pupils and imams in mosques and madrasahs. It contains much Arabic and Persian religious lexicon, and no usage of Chinese characters. This system is relatively standardised, and could be considered a true writing system. The "Daily system" is the system used by the less educated for letters and correspondences on a personal level. Often simple Chinese characters are mixed in with the Arabic script, mostly discussing non-religious matters, and therewith relatively little Arabic and Persian loans. This practice can differ drastically from person to person. The system would be devised by the writer himself, with one's own understanding of the Arabic and Persian alphabets, mapped accordingly to one's own dialectal pronunciation. Often, only the letter's sender and the letter's receiver can understand completely what is written, while being very difficult for others to read. Unlike Hui Muslims in other areas of China, Muslims of the northwest provinces of Shaanxi and Gansu had no knowledge of the Han Kitab or Literary Chinese, they used Xiao'erjing. Xiao'erjing was used to annotate foreign language Islamic documents (in languages like Persian) using the Chinese language.

Xiao'erjing was used mostly by Muslims who could not read Chinese characters. It was imperfect due to various factors. The differing Chinese dialects would require multiple different depictions with Xiao'erjing. Xiao'erjing cannot display the tones present in Chinese, syllable endings are indistinguishable, i.e. xi'an and xian. Xiao'erjing was much simpler than Chinese characters for representing Chinese.

=== Modern usage ===
In recent years, the usage of Xiao'erjing is nearing extinction due to the growing Chinese economy and the improvement of Chinese character education in rural parts of the country. Chinese characters, along with pinyin, have since replaced Xiao'erjing. Since the mid-1980s, there has been much scholarly work done within and outside China concerning Xiao'erjing. On-location research has been conducted and the users of Xiao'erjing have been interviewed. Written and printed materials of Xiao'erjing were also collected by researchers, the ones at Nanjing University being the most comprehensive. Kazuhiko Machida is leading a project in Japan concerning Xiao'erjing. Books are printed in Xiao'erjing. In Arabic language Qur'ans, Xiao'erjing annotations are used to help women read. Xiao'erjing is used to explain certain terms when used as annotations. Xiao'erjing is also used to write Chinese language Qurans.

A Dachang Hui Imam, Ma Zhenwu, wrote a Qur'an translation into Chinese including Chinese characters and Xiao'erjing.

== Alphabet ==
Xiao'erjing has 31 letters, 4 of which are used to represent vowel sounds. The 31 letters consists of 28 letters borrowed from Arabic, 4 letters borrowed from Persian along with 2 modified letters and 1 extra letter unique to Xiao'erjing.

=== Initials and consonants ===
Below table demonstrates the list of consonants, and cases in which two consonants represent the same initial, in the bopomofo order.

ب B b	پ P p	م M m	ف F f	د D d	ت / ط T t	ن N n	ل L l
ق G g	ک K k	ح / خ H h	ݣ‌ (د)^{1} J j	ک (ٿ)^{2} Q q	ث X x	ج Zh zh	چ Ch ch
ش Sh sh	ژ / ر R r	ز / ظ Z z	ڞ C c	س / ص S s	ی Y y	و W w	ء / ا / ع Glottal

Note:

1. ⟨د⟩ is more commonly used instead of ⟨ݣ‌⟩ in Linxia manuscripts to better closely match the local dialect's pronunciation.
2. ⟨ٿ⟩ is more commonly used instead of ⟨ک⟩ in Linxia manuscripts to better closely match the local dialect's pronunciation.

Below is the list of initials and consonants used in Xiao'erjing.

	Symbol	Final–Medial–Initial	Standard Chinese	Bopomofo	Pinyin	Arabic	Example	Notes
1	(ا)	(ـا)	/a/ [ɑ], [a]	ㄚ	a, a-, -a, -a-	[aː]	اَ (阿 ā)	Vowel sound
2	(ب)	(ببب)	/p/ [p], [b]-	ㄅ	b-	[b]	بَا (爸 bà)	
3	(پ)	(پپپ)	/pʰ/ [pʰ]-	ㄆ	p-	none (Persian [p])	پُوَ (婆 pó)	Borrowed from Persian
4	(ت)	(تتت)	/tʰ/ [tʰ]-	ㄊ	t-	[t]	تَا (塔 tǎ)	Used before syllable with all Hanyu Pinyin finals except for -ong, -uan, -ui, -un, -uo
5	(ث)	(ثثث)	[tɕʰ]-, [ɕ]-	ㄑ、ㄒ	x-	[θ]	ثِیَ (些 xiē)	Historically, manuscripts have also used س and ش
6	(ج)	(ججج)	/ʈ͡ʂ/ [ʈ͡ʂ], [ɖ͡ʐ]	ㄓ	zh-	[dʒ]	جَ (这/這 zhè)	Sound change occurs when representing Chinese
7	(چ)	(چچچ)	/ʈ͡ʂʰ/ [ʈ͡ʂʰ]	ㄔ	ch-	none (Persian [tʃ])	چَ (车/車 chē)	Borrowed from Persian
8	(ح)	(ححح)	/x/ [x]-	ㄏ	h-	[ħ]	حَ (河 hé)	Used before syllable with the Hanyu Pinyin finals -e, -ei, -en, -eng
9	(خ)	(خخخ)	/x/ [x]-	ㄏ	h-	[x]	خُ (湖 hú)	Used before syllable with all Hanyu Pinyin finals except for -e, -ei, -en, -eng
10	(د)	(د)	/t/ [t], [d]-; [tɕ]-	ㄉ	d-	[d]	دٍ (钉/釘 dīng)	Used by some manuscripts to represent a few syllables with the Hanyu Pinyin initial j-. More commonly "ݣ" was used
11	(ر)	(ر)	/ɻ/ [ɻ], [ʐ]-	ㄖ	r-	[r]	رٍ (仍 réng)	Used before syllables with the Hanyu Pinyin finals -eng, -un, -uo
11	(ر)	(ر)	/ɻ/ -[ɻ]	ㄦ	-r	[r]	عَر (二 èr)	Represents the rhotic final -r sound
12	(ز)	(ز)	/ʦ/ [t͡s], [d͡z]-	ㄗ	z-	[z]	زَیْ (在 zài)	Used before syllable with all Hanyu Pinyin finals except for -ong, -ui, -un, -uo "ذ" is used by some manuscripts instead
13	(ژ)	(ژ)	/ɻ/ [ɻ], [ʐ]-	ㄖ	r-	none (Persian [ʒ])	ژَ (热/熱 rè)	Used before syllable with all Hanyu Pinyin finals except for -eng, -un, -uo
14	(س)	(سسس)	/s/ [s]-, [ɕ]-	ㄙ	s-	[s]	سِْ (四 sì)	Used before syllable with all Hanyu Pinyin finals except for -ua, -ui, -un, -uo. Historically, manuscripts have also used this letter for Hanyu Pinyin initial x-
15	(ش)	(ششش)	/ʂ/ [ʂ]-, [ɕ]-	ㄕ	sh-	[ʃ]	شِ (是 shì)	Historically, manuscripts have also used this letter for Hanyu Pinyin initial x-
16	(ص)	(صصص)	/s/ [s]-	ㄙ	s-	[sˤ]	صُوِ (岁/歲 suì)	Used before syllables with the Hanyu Pinyin finals -ua, -ui, -un, -uo
17	(ڞ)	(ڞڞڞ)	/ʦʰ/ [t͡sʰ]-	ㄘ	c-	none	ڞَ (册/冊 cè)	
18	(ط)	(ططط)	/t/ [t], [d]-; [tɕ]-	ㄉ	t-	[tˤ]	طٌ (吞 tūn)	Used before syllables with the Hanyu Pinyin finals -ong, -uan, -ui, -un, -uo
19	(ظ)	(ظظظ)	/ʦ/ [t͡s], [d͡z]-	ㄗ	z-	[ðˤ]	ظُوَ (作 zuò)	Sound change occurs when representing Chinese. Used before syllable with the Hanyu Pinyin finals -ong, -ui, -un, -uo
20	(ع)	(ععع)	/ə/	ㄜ, ㄦ, ㄛ, ㄡ	e, er, o, ou	[ʕ]	عَ (恶/惡 è)	A vowel when representing Chinese, but considered a consonant when representing Arabic and Persian loans
21	(ف)	(ففف)	/f/ [f]-	ㄈ	f-	[f]	فِ (废/廢 fèi)	
22	(ق)	(ققق)	/k/ [k], [ɡ]-	ㄍ	g-	[q]	قْ (个/個 ge)	Sound change occurs when representing Chinese
23	(ک)	(ککک)	/kʰ/ [kʰ]-	ㄎ	k-	[k]	کْ (可 kě)	
23	(ک)	(ککک)	[tɕʰ]-	ㄑ	q-	[k]	کِیٌ (穷/窮 qióng)	Historically, in Linxia manuscripts, ٿ is more commonly used to represent Hanyu Pinyin initial q-, to more closely match the local dialect's pronunciation
24	(ݣ)	(ݣݣݣ)	[tɕ]-	ㄐ	j-	none	ڭِیُوَ (脚/腳 jiǎo)	Used in most manuscripts to represent "j-". Some manuscripts drop the three dots and simply use "ک"
25	(ل)	(للل)	/l/ [l]-	ㄌ	l-	[l]	لِ (里 lǐ)	
26	(م)	(ممم)	/m/ [m]-	ㄇ	m-	[m]	مِ (秘 mì)	
27	(ن)	(ننن)	/n/ [n]-	ㄋ	n-	[n]	نِ (你 nǐ)	
28	(و)	(و)	/u/ [u], [ʊ]	ㄨ	wu, wa, wai, wang, wan, wei, wen, weng, wo, u-, -u, -u-	[w], [uː]	وُ (无/無 wú)	Vowel sound
29	(ی)	(ییی)	/i/ [i], [ɪ]	ㄧ	yi, i-, -i, -i-	[j], [iː]	یَا (呀 ya)	Borrowed from Persian and a vowel sound. (See Perso-Arabic ye)
30	(ء)	(ء)	[i], [ɪ], [ɥ]	ㄩ	yi, yin, yun	[ʔ]	ءٌ (孕 yùn)	

=== Additional consonants ===
The consonants in this list are either lesser used alternatives used in regional varieties of Xiao'erjing, or they are common Arabic or Persian letters that are exclusively used for writing loan words in Xiao'erjing texts.

	Symbol	Final–Medial–Initial	Standard Mandarin pronunciation	Bopomofo	Hanyu Pinyin	Arabic pronunciation	Example	Notes
1	(ٿ)	(ٿٿٿ)	[tɕʰ]-	ㄑ	q-	none	ٿِیٌ (穷/窮 qióng)	Unique Xiao'erjing letter. Historically, in Linxia manuscripts, this letter instead of ک was used to represent Hanyu Pinyin initial q-, to more closely match the local dialect's pronunciation
2	(ذ)	(ذ)	/ʦ/ [t͡s], [d͡z]-	ㄗ	z-	[ð]	ذَیْ (在 zài)	Some manuscripts use this letter instead of ز
3	(ض)	(ضضض)	none		none	[dˤ]	الْضَّاد (letter ḍād)	Only used with Arabic loans
4	(غ)	(غغغ)	none		none	[ɣ]	غَبْن (criminal fraud)	Only used with Arabic loans
5	(گ)	(گگگ)	none	ㄍ	none	none (Persian [ɡ])	گنج (treasure)	Borrowed from Persian and only used with Persian loans
6	(ه)	(ههه)	/x/ [x]-	ㄏ	h-	[h]	الهواء (air)	Only used with Persian and Arabic loans

=== Finals and vowels ===
Below is the list of final and vowel endings in each syllable representing each Hanzi in Xiao'erjing.

	Script	Standard Chinese pronunciation	Bopomofo	Hanyu Pinyin	Example	Notes
1		[ɑ]	ㄚ	a	اَ (阿 ā)	
2		-[ɑ]	ㄚ	-a	دَا (大 dà)	
3		[aɪ]	ㄞ	ai	اَیْ (爱/愛 ài)	
4		-[aɪ]	ㄞ	-ai	كَیْ (凯/凱 kǎi)	
5		[an]	ㄢ	an	اً (安 ān)	
6		-[an]	ㄢ	-an	دًا (但 dàn)	
7		[ɑŋ]	ㄤ	ang	اَنْ (昂 áng)	
8		-[ɑŋ]	ㄤ	-ang	قَانْ (刚/剛 gāng)	
9		[aʊ]	ㄠ	ao	اَوْ (奥/奧 ào)	
10		-[aʊ]	ㄠ	-ao	قَوْ (高 gāo)	
11		[ə]|[ɤ]	ㄜ	e	عَ (恶/惡 è)	
12		-[ə]|[ɤ]	ㄜ	-e	دْ (德 dé)	For Hanyu Pinyin initials d-, g-, k, t-
12		-[ə]|[ɤ]	ㄜ	-e	ڞَ (册/冊 cè)	For other Hanyu Pinyin initials
13	none	[eɪ]	ㄟ	ei	none	Rare, no representation in Xiao'erjing
14		-[eɪ]	ㄟ	-ei	مُوِ (玫 méi）	For Hanyu Pinyin initials b-, l-, m-, n-, p-
14		-[eɪ]	ㄟ	-ei	فِ (飞/飛 fēi）	For other Hanyu Pinyin initials Arabic diacritic ﹾ is added to letters that don't connect to the following letter, so that the confusion of reading two characters as one syllable can be avoided
14		-[eɪ]	ㄟ	-ei	دِْ (得 děi)	For other Hanyu Pinyin initials Arabic diacritic ﹾ is added to letters that don't connect to the following letter, so that the confusion of reading two characters as one syllable can be avoided
15		[ən]	ㄣ	en	عٍ (恩 ēn)	
16		-[ən]	ㄣ	-en	مٌ (们/們 mén)	For Hanyu Pinyin initials b-, f-, m-, n-, p-
16		-[ən]	ㄣ	-en	قٍ (根 gēn)	For other Hanyu Pinyin initials
17	none	[əŋ]	ㄥ	eng	none	Rare, no representation in Xiao'erjing
18		-[ɤŋ]	ㄥ	-eng	رٍ (仍 réng)	Only for Hanyu Pinyin initial r-
18		-[ɤŋ]	ㄥ	-eng	قْ‌ٍ (更 gèng)	For all other Hanyu Pinyin initials
19		[ɑɻ]	ㄦ	er	عَر (儿/兒 er)	
20		-[ɻ]	ㄦ	-r	لِر (粒儿/粒兒 lìr)	Represents the rhotic final -r sound
21		[i]	ㄧ	yi	ءِ (意 yì)	
22		-[i] / -[ɯ] / -[ɨ]	ㄧ	-i	سِْ (四 sì)	Only for Hanyu Pinyin initial s-
22		-[i] / -[ɯ] / -[ɨ]	ㄧ	-i	کِ (其 qí)	For all other Hanyu Pinyin initials
23		[iɑ]	ㄧㄚ	ya	یَا (呀 ya)	
24		-[iɑ]	ㄧㄚ	-ia	ݣِیَا (家 jiā)	Limited to syllables with the Hanyu Pinyin initials d-, j-, q-, x-, l-
25		[iɛn]	ㄧㄢ	yan	یًا (严/嚴 yán)	
26		-[iɛn]	ㄧㄢ	-ian	لِیًا (练/練 liàn)	
27		[iɑŋ]	ㄧㄤ	yang	یَانْ (羊 yáng)	
28		-[iɑŋ]	ㄧㄤ	-iang	لِیَانْ (良 liáng)	
29		[iaʊ]	ㄧㄠ	yao	یَوْ (要 yào)	
30		-[iaʊ]	ㄧㄠ	-iao	ݣِیَوْ (教 jiào)	
31		[iɛ]	ㄧㄝ	ye	یِ (耶 yē)	
32		-[iɛ]	ㄧㄝ	-ie	ݣِیَ (解 jiě)	
33		[in]	ㄧㄣ	yin	ءٍ (因 yīn)	
34		-[in]	ㄧㄣ	-in	کٍ (勤 qín)	
35		[iŋ]	ㄧㄥ	ying	یْ‌ٍ (应/應 yīng)	
36		-[iŋ]	ㄧㄥ	-ing	تٍ (圢 tǐng)	After syllables with the Hanyu Pinyin initials d-, t-
36		-[iŋ]	ㄧㄥ	-ing	ݣْ‌ٍ (汫 jǐng)	After syllables with the Hanyu Pinyin initials j-, q-, x-
36		-[iŋ]	ㄧㄥ	-ing	پِیٍٔ (平 píng)	After syllables with the Hanyu Pinyin initials b-, p-, m-, n-, l-
37		[yʊŋ]	ㄩㄥ	yong	یٌ (用 yòng)	
38	or	-[yʊŋ]	ㄩㄥ	-iong	کِیٌ (穷/窮 qióng)	Limited to syllables with the Hanyu Pinyin initials j-, q-, x-
39		[iəʊ]|[iɤʊ]	ㄧㄡ	you	یِوْ (有 yǒu)	
40		-[iəʊ]|[iɤʊ]	ㄧㄡ	-iu	نِیُوْ (牛 niú)	
41		[o]	ㄛ	o	عِو (哦 ó)	
42		-[ʊŋ]	ㄨㄥ	-ong	سٌ (讼/訟 sòng)	Only for Hanyu Pinyin initial s-, r-
42		-[ʊŋ]	ㄨㄥ	-ong	خْو (宏 hóng)	For all other Hanyu Pinyin initials
43		[əʊ]|[ɤʊ]	ㄡ	ou	عِوْ (偶 ǒu)	
44		-[əʊ]|[ɤʊ]	ㄡ	-ou	كِوْ (口 kǒu)	
45		[u]	ㄨ	wu	وُ (无/無 wú)	
46		-[u]	ㄨ	-u	کُ (苦 kǔ)	Arabic letter و is added to letters that don't connect to the following letter, so that the confusion of reading two characters as one syllable can be avoided
46		-[u]	ㄨ	-u	زُو (足 zú)	Arabic letter و is added to letters that don't connect to the following letter, so that the confusion of reading two characters as one syllable can be avoided
47		[uɑ]	ㄨㄚ	wa	وَا (娃 wá)	
48		-[uɑ]	ㄨㄚ	-ua	قُوَا (刮 guā)	
49		[uaɪ]	ㄨㄞ	wai	وَیْ (歪 wāi)	
50		-[uaɪ]	ㄨㄞ	-uai	كُوَیْ (块/塊 kuài)	
51		[uan]|[wan]	ㄨㄢ	wan	وًا (万/萬 wàn)	
52		-[uan]	ㄨㄢ	-uan	كُوًا (宽/寬 kuān)	
53		[uɑŋ]|[wɑŋ]	ㄨㄤ	wang	وَانْ (忘 wàng)	
54		-[uɑŋ]	ㄨㄤ	-uang	کُوَانْ (况/況 kuàng)	
55		[ueɪ]	ㄨㄟ	wei	وِ (为/為 wèi)	
56		-[ueɪ]	ㄨㄟ	-ui	خُوِ (回 huí)	
57		[uən]|[wən]	ㄨㄣ	wen	وٌ (问/問 wèn)	
58		-[uən]	ㄨㄣ	-un	کٌ (困 kùn)	
59		[uɤŋ]|[wɤŋ]	ㄨㄥ	weng	وٍْ (翁 wēng)	
60		[uə]	ㄨㄛ	wo	وَ (我 wǒ)	
61		-[uə]	ㄨㄛ	-uo	قُوَ (国/國 guó)	
61		-[uə]	ㄨㄛ	-o	بُوَ (拨/撥 bō)	Hanyu Pinyin initials b-, p-, m-, f-
62		[y]	ㄩ	yu	یُوِ (与/與 yǔ)	
63		-[y]	ㄩ	-ü, -u	نِیُوِ (女 nǚ)	Limited to syllables with the Hanyu Pinyin initials j-, q-, x-, l-, n-
64		[yɛn]	ㄩㄢ	yuan	یُوًا (源 yuán)	
65		-[yɛn]	ㄩㄢ	-uan	ݣِیُوًا (捐 juān)	Limited to syllables with the Hanyu Pinyin initials j-, q-, x-
66		[yɛ]	ㄩㄝ	yue	یُوَ (约/約 yuē)	
67		-[yɛ]	ㄩㄝ	-üe, -ue	ݣِیُوَ (决/決 jué)	Limited to syllables with the Hanyu Pinyin initials j-, q-, x-, l-, n-
68		[yn]	ㄩㄣ	yun	ءٌ (孕 yùn)	
69		-[yn]	ㄩㄣ	-un	کٌ (均 jūn)	Limited to syllables with the Hanyu Pinyin initials j-, q-, x-

- Vowels in Arabic and Persian loans follow their respective orthographies, namely, only the long vowels are represented and the short vowels are omitted. Although the sukun can be omitted when representing Arabic and Persian loans, it cannot be omitted when representing Chinese. The exception being that of oft-used monosyllabic words which can have the sukun omitted from writing. For example, when emphasised, "的" and "和" are written as (دِ) and (حـَ); when unemphasised, they can be written with the sukuns as (دْ) and (حـْ), or without the sukuns as (د) and (حـ).
- Similarly, the sukun can also sometimes represent the Chinese -[ŋ] final, as such (ـنْ / نْ). This is sometimes replaced by the fatḥatan, the kasratan, or the dammatan in manuscripts.

In polysyllabic words, the final 'alif (ـا) that represents the long vowel -ā can be omitted and replaced by a fatḥah representing the short vowel -ă.

- Xiao'erjing is similar to Hanyu Pinyin in the respect that words are written as one, while a space is inserted between words. A U+200C ZERO WIDTH NON-JOINER (&zwnj;) shall be used for separation between different syllables within the same word. Unlike Persian or Arabic, syllables (each representing one Hanji character) are not continuously connected.
- When representing Chinese words, the shaddah sign represents a doubling of the entire syllable on which it rests. It has the same function as the Chinese iteration mark "々".
- Arabic punctuation marks can be used with Xiao'erjing as can Chinese punctuation marks, they can also be mixed (Chinese pauses and periods with Arabic commas and quotation marks).

== Correspondences with pinyin ==
Correspondence chart between Pinyin and Xiao'erjing
Organized alphabetically
A
a — اَ	ai — اَیْ	an — اً	ang — اَنْ
ao — اَوْ
B
ba — بَا	bai — بَیْ	ban — بًا	bang — بَانْ
bao — بَوْ	bei — بُوِ	ben — بٌ	beng — بٍْ
bi — بِ	bian — بِیًا	biao — بِیَوْ	bie — بِیَ
bin — بٍ	bing — بِیٍٔ	bo — بُوَ	bu — بُ
C
ca — ڞَا	cai — ڞَیْ	can — ڞًا	cang — ڞَانْ
cao — ڞَوْ	ce — ڞَ	cen — ڞٍ	ceng — ڞْ‌ٍ
ci — ڞِ	cong — ڞْو	cou — ڞِوْ	cu — ڞُ
cuan — ڞُوًا	cui — ڞُوِ	cun — ڞٌ	cuo — ڞُوَ
CH
cha — چَا	chai — چَیْ	chan — چًا	chang — چَانْ
chao —چَوْ	che — چَ	chen — چٍ	cheng — چٍْ
chi — چِ	chong — چْو	chou — چِوْ	chu — چُ
chuai — چُوَیْ	chuan — چُوًا	chuang — چُوَانْ	chui — چُوِ
chun — چٌ	chuo — چُوَ		
D
da — دَا	dai — دَیْ	dan — دًا	dang — دَانْ
dao — دَوْ	de — دْ	dei — دِْ	deng — دٍْ
di — دِ	dia — دِیَا	dian — دِیًا	diao — دِیَوْ
die — دِیَ	ding — دٍ	diu — دِیُوْ	dong — دْو
dou — دِوْ	du — دُو	duan — دُوًا	dui — دُوِ
dun — دٌ	duo — دُوَ		
E
e — عَ	er — عَر		
F
fa — فَا	fan — فًا	fang — فَانْ	fei — فِ
fen — فٌ	feng — فٍْ	fo — فُوَ	fou — فِوْ
fu — فُ			
G
ga — قَا	gai — قَیْ	gan — قًا	gang — قَانْ
gao — قَوْ	ge — قْ	gei — قِ	gen — قٍ
geng — قٍْ	gong — قْو	gou — قِوْ	gu — قُ
gua — قُوَا	guai — قُوَیْ	guan — قُوًا	guang — قُوَانْ
gui — قُوِ	gun — قٌ	guo — قُوَ	
H
ha — خَا	hai — خَیْ	han — خًا	hang — خَانْ
hao — خَوْ	he — حَ	hei — حِ	hen — حٍ
heng — حٍْ	hong — خْو	hou — خِوْ	hu — خُ
hua — خُوَا	huai — خُوَیْ	huan — خُوًا	huang — خُوَانْ
hui — خُوِ	hun — خٌ	huo — خُوَ	
J
ji — ݣِ	jia — ݣِیَا	jian — ݣِیًا	jiang — ݣِیَانْ
jiao — ݣِیَوْ	jie — ݣِیَ	jin — ݣٍ	jing — ݣٍْ
jiong — ݣِیٌ	jiu — ݣِیُوْ	ju — ݣِیُوِ	juan — ݣِیُوًا
jue — ݣِیُوَ	jun — ݣٌ		
K
ka — کَا	kai — کَیْ	kan — کًا	kang — کَانْ
kao — کَوْ	ke — کْ	ken — کٍ	keng — کٍْ
kong — کْو	kou — کِوْ	ku — کُ	kua — کُوَا
kuai — کُوَیْ	kuan — کُوًا	kuang — کُوَانْ	kui — کُوِ
kun — کٌ	kuo — کُوَ		
L
la — لَا	lai — لَیْ	lan — لًا	lang — لَانْ
lao — لَوْ	le — لَ	lei — لُوِ	leng — لٍْ
li — لِ	lia — لِیَا	lian — لِیًا	liang — لِیَانْ
liao — لِیَوْ	lie — لِیَ	lin — لٍ	ling — لِیٍٔ
liu — لِیُوْ	long — لْو	lou — لِوْ	lu — لُ
lü — لِیُوِ	luan — لُوًا	lüe — لِیُوَ	lun — لٌ
luo — لُوَ			
M
ma — مَا	mai — مَیْ	man — مًا	
mang — مَانْ	mao — مَوْ	me — مَ	mei — مُوِ
men — مٌ	meng — مٍْ	mi — مِ	mian — مِیًا
miao — مِیَوْ	mie — مِیَ	min — مٍ	ming — مِیٍٔ
miu — مِیُوْ	mo — مُوَ	mou — مِوْ	mu — مُ
N
na — نَا	nai — نَیْ	nan — نًا	
nang — نَانْ	nao — نَوْ	ne — نَ	nei — نُوِ
nen — نٌ	neng — نٍْ	ni — نِ	
nian — نِیًا	niang — نِیَانْ	niao — نِیَوْ	nie — نِیَ
nin — نٍ	ning — نِیٍٔ	niu — نِیُوْ	nong — نْو
nu — نُ	nü — نِیُوِ	nuan — نُوًا	nüe — نِیُوَ
nuo — نُوَ			
O
o — عِو	ou — عِوْ		
P
pa — پَا	pai — پَیْ	pan — پًا	pang — پَانْ
pao — پَوْ	pei — پُوِ	pen — پٌ	peng — پٍْ
pi — پِ	pian — پِیًا	piao — پِیَوْ	pie — پِیَ
pin — پٍ	ping — پِیٍٔ	po — پُوَ	pou — پِوْ
pu — پُ			
Q
qi — کِ (ٿِ)	qia — کِیَا (ٿِیَا)	qian — کِیًا (ٿِیًا)	qiang — کِیَانْ (ٿِیَانْ)
qiao — کِیَوْ (ٿِیَوْ)	qie — کِیَ (ٿِیَ)	qin — کٍ (ٿٍ)	qing — کٍْ (ٿٍْ)
qiong — کِیٌ (ٿِیٌ)	qiu — کِیُوْ (ٿِیُوْ)	qu — کِیُوِ (ٿِیُوِ)	quan — کِیُوًا (ٿِیُوًا)
que — کِیُوَ (ٿِیُوَ)	qun — کٌ (ٿٌ)		
R
ran — ژًا	rang — ژَانْ	rao — ژَوْ	re — ژَ
ren — ژٍ	reng — رٍ	ri — ژِ	rong — ژٌ
rou — ژِوْ	ru — ژُو	ruan — ژُوًا	rui — ژُوِ
run — رٌ	ruo — رُوَ		
S
sa — سَا	sai — سَیْ	san — سًا	sang — سَانْ
sao — سَوْ	se — سَ	sen — سٍ	seng — سٍْ
si — سِْ	song — سٌ	sou — سِوْ	su — سُ
suan — صُوًا	sui — صُوِ	sun — صٌ	suo — صُوَ
SH
sha — شَا	shai — شَیْ	shan — شًا	shang — شَانْ
shao — شَوْ	she — شَ	shei — شُوِ	shen — شٍ
sheng — شٍْ	shi — شِ	shou — شِوْ	shu — شُ
shua — شُوَا	shuai — شُوَیْ	shuan — شُوًا	shuang — شُوَانْ
shui — شُوِ	shun — شٌ	shuo — شُوَ	
T
ta — تَا	tai — تَیْ	tan — تًا	tang — تَانْ
tao — تَوْ	te — تْ	teng — تٍْ	
ti — تِ	tian — تِیًا	tiao — تِیَوْ	tie — تِیَ
ting — تٍ	tong — طْو	tou — تِوْ	tu — تُ
tuan — طُوًا	tui — طُوِ	tun — طٌ	tuo — طُوَ
W
wa — وَا	wai — وَیْ	wan — وًا	wang — وَانْ
wei — وِ	wen — وٌ	weng — وٍْ	wo — وَ
wu — وُ			
X
xi — ثِ	xia — ثِیَا	xian — ثِیًا	xiang — ثِیَانْ
xiao — ثِیَوْ	xie — ثِیَ	xin — ثٍ	xing — ثٍْ
xiong — ثِیٌ	xiu — ثِیُوْ	xu — ثِیُوِ	xuan — ثِیُوًا
xue — ثِیُوَ	xun — ثٌ		
Y
ya — یَا	yan — یًا	yang — یَانْ	yao — یَوْ
ye — یَ	yi — ءِ	yin — ءٍ	ying — یٍ
yong — یٌ	you — یُوْ	yu — یُوِ	yuan — یُوًا
yue — یُوَ	yun — ءٌ		
Z
za — زَا	zai — زَیْ	zan — زًا	zang — زَانْ
zao — زَوْ	ze — زَ	zei — زِْ	zen — زٍ
zeng — زٍْ	zi — زِ	zong — ظْو	zou — زِوْ
zu — زُو	zuan — زُوًا	zui — ظُوِ	zun — ظٌ
zuo — ظُوَ			
ZH
zha — جَا	zhai — جَیْ	zhan — جًا	zhang — جَانْ
zhao — جَوْ	zhe — جَ	zhei — جُوِ	zhen — جٍ
zheng — جٍْ	zhi — جِ	zhong — جْو	zhou — جِوْ
zhu — جُ	zhua — جُوَا	zhuai — جُوَیْ	zhuan — جُوًا
zhuang — جُوَانْ	zhui — جُوِ	zhun — جٌ	zhuo — جُوَ

== Example ==
=== Article 1 of the Universal Declaration of Human Rights ===
Article 1 of the Universal Declaration of Human Rights in Xiao'erjing, as well as simplified and traditional Chinese characters, pinyin, and English:

Xiao'erjing
«ژٍّ شْ‌ٍ عَر زِیُوْ، زَیْ ظٌ‌یًا حَ‌ کِیُوًالِ شَانْ‌ ءِلِیُوِ پِیٍٔ‌دٍْ. تَامٌ فُ‌یُوْ لِ‌ثٍْ حَ لِیَانْ‌ثٍ، بِیٍٔ یٍ ءِ ثِیٌ‌دِ قُوًاثِ دْ ݣ‌ٍْشٍ خُ‌ثِیَانْ دُوِدَیْ.»

Simplified characters
「人人生而自由，在尊严和权利上一律平等。他们赋有理性和良心，并应以兄弟关系的精神互相对待。」

Traditional characters

「人人生而自由，在尊嚴和權利上一律平等。他們賦有理性和良心，並應兄弟關係的精神互相對待。」

Correspondence between Chinese characters and Xiao'erjing
「人(ژٍ)人(ژٍ)生(شْ‌ٍ)而(عَر)自(زِ)由(یُوْ)，在(زَیْ)尊(ظٌ‌)严(یًا)和(حَ‌)权(کِیُوًا)利(لِ)上(شَانْ‌)一(ءِ)律(لِیُوِ)平(پِیٍٔ‌)等(دٍْ)。他(تَا)们(مٌ)赋(فُ‌)有(یُوْ)理(لِ‌)性(ثٍْ)和(حَ‌)良(لِیَانْ‌)心(ثٍ)，并(بِیٍٔ)应(یٍ)以(ءِ)兄(ثِیٌ‌)弟(دِ)关(قُوًا)系(ثِ)的(دْ)精(ݣ‌ٍْ)神(شٍ)互(خُ‌)相(ثِیَانْ)对(دُوِ)待(دَیْ)。」

Pinyin
"Rénrén shēng ér zìyóu, zài zūnyán hé quánlì shàng yílǜ píngděng. Tāmen fùyǒu lǐxìng hé liángxīn, bìng yīng yǐ xiōngdi guānxì de jīngshén hùxiāng duìdài."

English
"All human beings are born free and equal in dignity and rights. They are endowed with reason and conscience and should act toward one another in a spirit of brotherhood."

=== Al-Fatiha (الفَاتِحَةِ) ===
Below is the first sura (chapter) of the Quran, Al-Fatiha, its original Arabic text, English translation, as well as the Chinese translation in Simplified Chinese characters and in Xiao'erjing, as published (un-edited) in 1995 by Ma Zhenwu (马振武).

In the Xiao'erjing version of this sura, the author may have made minor choices about characters and pronunciations that may differ from what is shown in this article, and they may even have minor inconsistencies in the text itself. Furthermore, as is the tradition for Xiao'erjing texts, there are instances where Arabic or Persian loanwords are used and written directly, these are shown in bold. In this document, the Hanzi characters are written from right to left, following the flow of the Arabic text of the Quran and the Xiao'erjing translation.

English translation

1. In the name of Allāh, the Entirely Merciful, the Especially Merciful!
2. [All] praise is [due] to Allāh, Lord of the worlds,
3. The Entirely Merciful, the Especially Merciful,
4. Sovereign of the Day of Recompense!
5. It is You we worship and You we ask for help!
6-7. Guide us to the straight path, the path of those upon whom You have bestowed favor, not of those who have earned [Your] anger or of those who are astray.

Simplified Characters

1. 〈我〉凭着普慈〈今世的，独慈〉，后世的，主的尊名、〈起〉
2. 感赞调养普世界的.
3. 普慈的独慈的.
4. 执掌还报日子的主.
5. 我们唯独拜你,我们唯独求你相助.
6-7. 求你引领我们至端庄的路道那一些人的路道. 你在他们上施过恩的，一些不受怒恼的，与一些不迷路的.

Pinyin

1. 〈Wǒ〉 píng zhe pǔ cí 〈jīn shì de, dú cí〉, hòu shì de, zhǔ de zūn míng,〈qǐ〉
2. Gǎn zàn tiáo yǎng pǔ shì jiè de.
3. Pǔ cí de dú cí de.
4. Zhí zhǎng huán bào rì zǐ de zhǔ.
5. Wǒ men wéi dú bài nǐ, wǒ men wéi dú qiú nǐ xiāng zhù.
6-7. Qiú nǐ yǐn lǐng wǒ men zhì duān zhuāng de lù dào nà yī xiē rén de lù dào. nǐ zài tā men shàng shī guò ēn de, yī xiē bù shòu nù nǎo de, yǔ yī xiē bù mí lù de.

Xiao'erjing

١-<وَ> پِئٍ جَوْ پُو ژِ <ݣِئٍ شِ> دِ دُ ژِ <خْخُوشِ> دِ جُو دِ ظُوٌ مٍ **«اِبْتِدَاءُ»**
٢-قًا زًا تِیَوْ یاۤنْ پُو شِ ݣِیَہ دِ
٣-پُو ژِ دِ دُ ژِ دِ
۴-جیِ جِاۤنْ خُوَنْ بَوْ **يَوْمَ** زِ دِ جُو
۵-وَ مٌ وِی دُ بَیْ نِہ، وَ مٌ وِی دُ کِیُو نِہ ثِیاۤنْ جُوُ.
۶-۷-کِیُو نِہ یِ لٍ وَ مٌ جِی دُوَن جُواَنْ دِ لُ دَوْ نَا یِ ثِیَہ **اُناس** دِ لُ دَوْ. نِہ زَ تَا مٌ شِاۤنْ شِ قُوَ عٍ دِ. یِ ثِیَہ بُو شِیُو نُو نَوْ دِ. ئِئِہ یِ ثِیَہ بُو مِ لُ دِ.

Al-Fatiha Arabic original

١-بِسْمِ اللَّهِ الرَّحْمَٰنِ الرَّحِيمِ
٢-الْحَمْدُ لِلَّهِ رَبِّ الْعَالَمِينَ
٣-الرَّحْمَٰنِ الرَّحِيمِ
٤-مَالِكِ يَوْمِ الدِّينِ
٥-إِيَّاكَ نَعْبُدُ وَإِيَّاكَ نَسْتَعِينُ
٦-۷-اهْدِنَا الصِّرَاطَ الْمُسْتَقِيمَ، صِرَاطَ الَّذِينَ أَنْعَمْتَ عَلَيْهِمْ غَيْرِ الْمَغْضُوبِ عَلَيْهِمْ وَلَا الضَّالِّينَ

== See also ==
- Aljamiado
- Arebica
- Category:Arabic alphabets
- Islam in China
- Jawi alphabet
- Jingtang Jiaoyu
- Sini
- Uyghur Arabic alphabet
