= Yueyang Museum =

- 岳阳博物馆
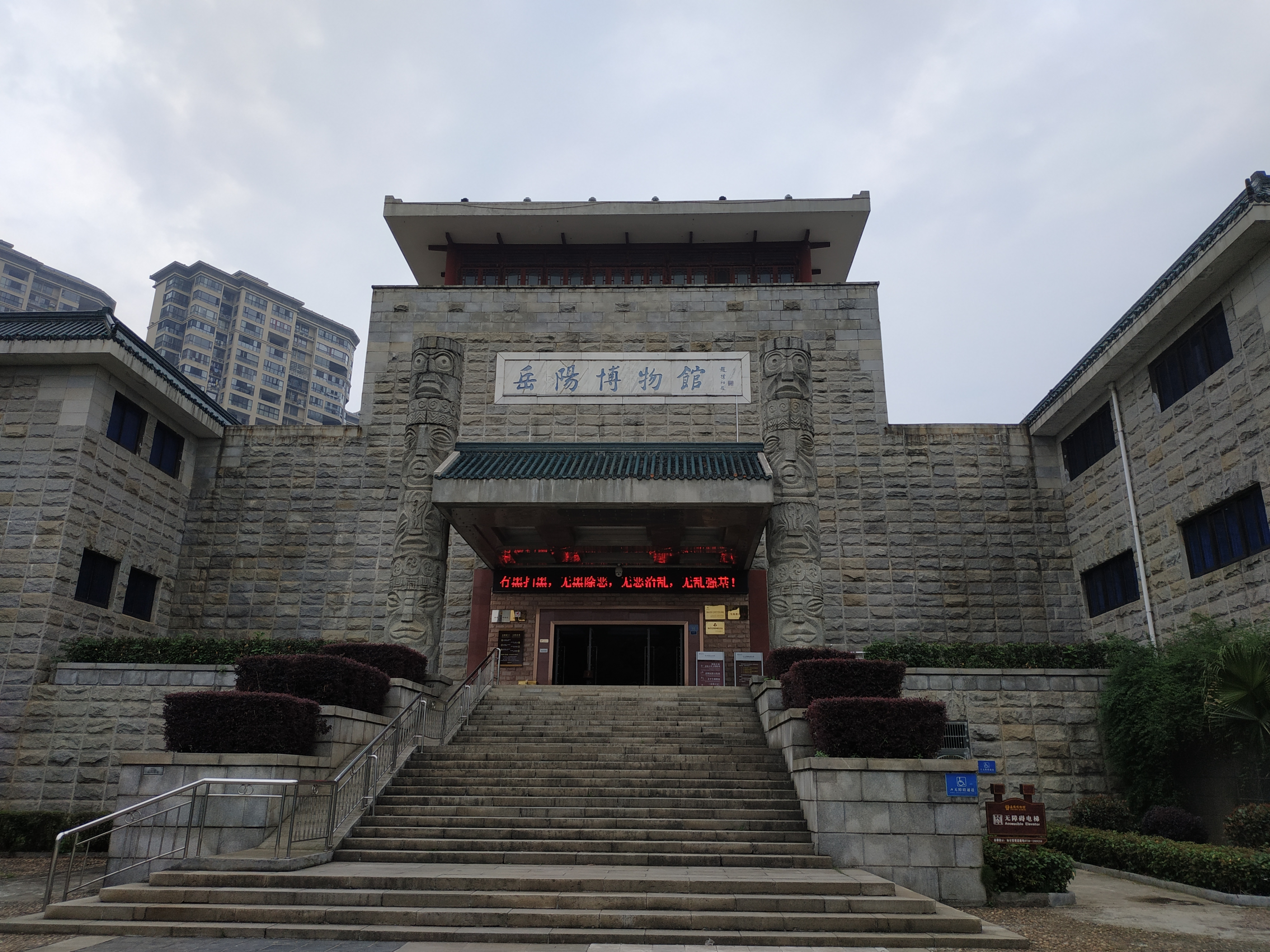
- Yueyang Museum in 2018

- Location in of the museum Yueyang Museum (China)
- Established: 29 October 1999
- Location: Yueyang, Hunan, China
- Coordinates: 29°20′55.46″N 113°06′52.05″E
- Type: Historical museum
- Key holdings: Cultural relics from Yueyang
- Collections: 20,000
- Founder: Yueyang Municipal Government
- President: Huang Junren (黄军认)

Yueyang Museum
- Traditional Chinese: 岳陽博物館
- Simplified Chinese: 岳阳博物馆
Transcriptions
Standard Mandarin
- Hanyu Pinyin: Yuèyáng Bówùguǎn

Yueyang Museum (Chinese: 岳阳博物馆) is a historical museum in Yueyang, Hunan, China. It covers a total area of 11,000-square-metre (2.7-acre) with a building area of 6,600-square-metre (1.6-acre). The museum has a collection of more than 20,000 objects, including 6 national first level protected cultural relics.

== History ==
Construction of Yueyang Museum, commenced in August 1996 and was completed the October 1999. Yueyang Museum was officially opened to the public on October 29 of that same year. The name was inscribed by Zhao Puchu, the former Venerable Master of the Buddhist Association of China.

== Gallery ==
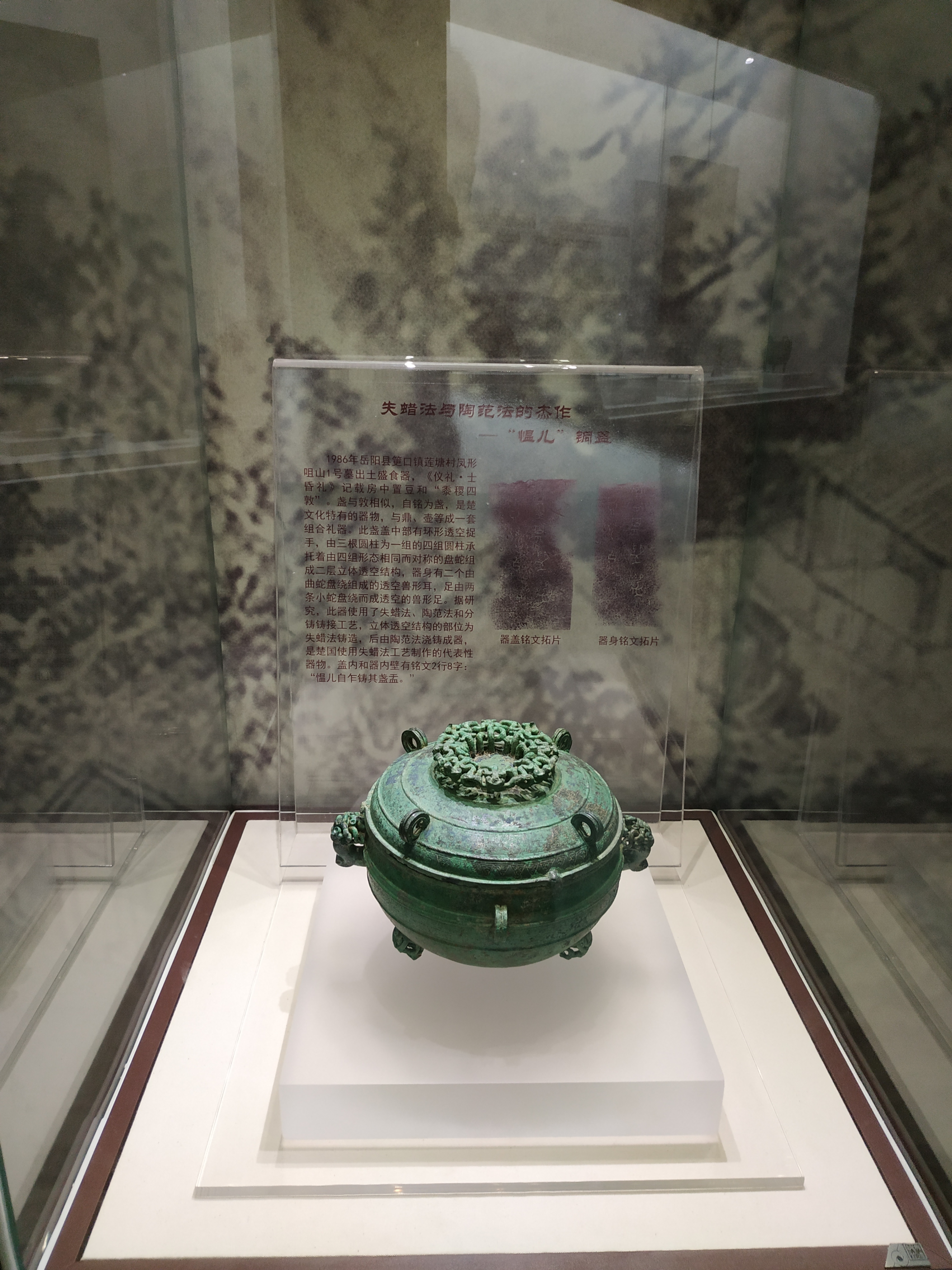
Bronze food vessel, Spring and Autumn period (475 BC-221 BC). Unearthed in 1986 in Liantang Village, Gangkou Town, Yueyang County. It is the most precious treasure in Yueyang Museum.

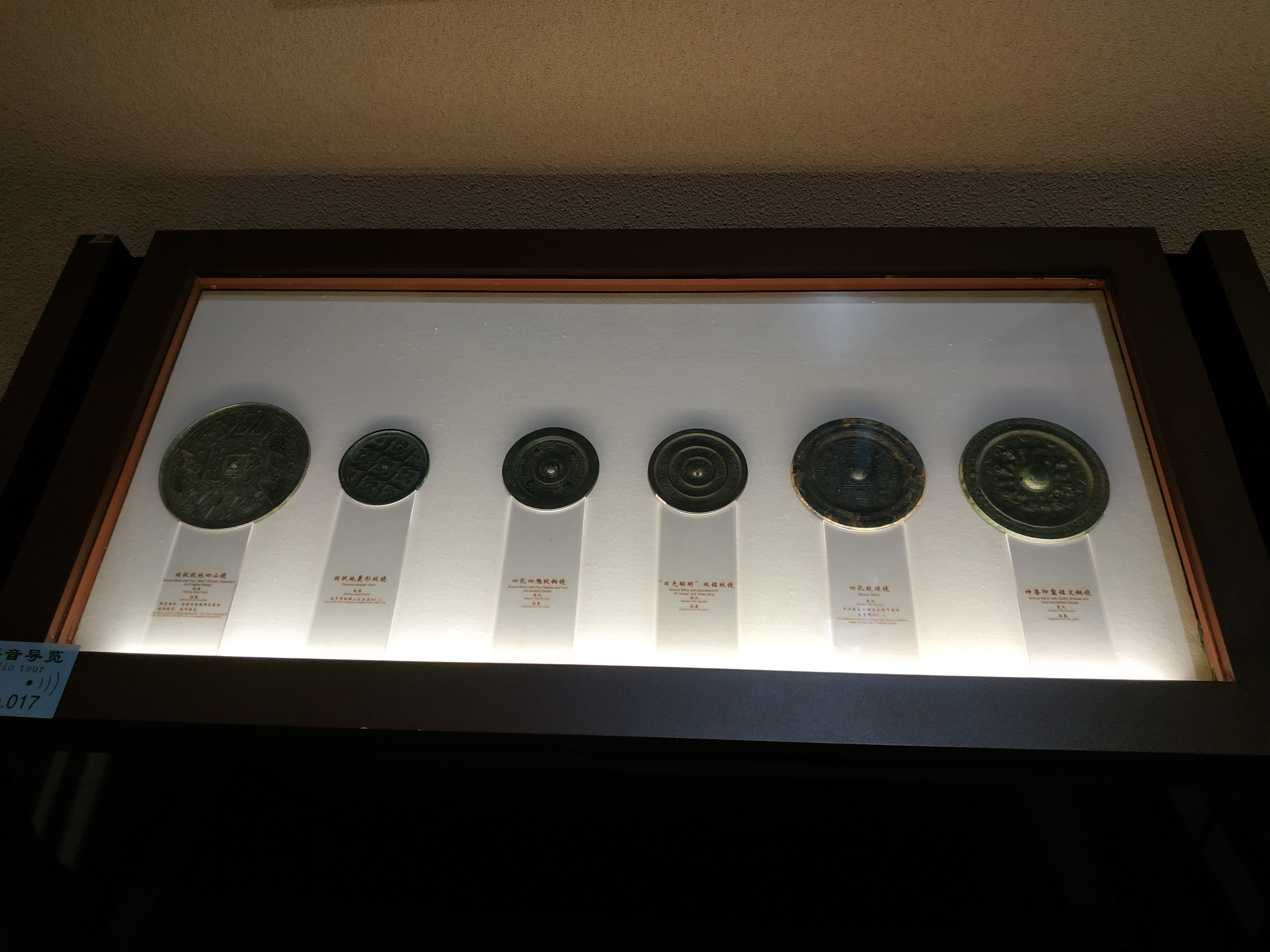
Bronze mirrors, Han dynasty (202 BC-220 AD).

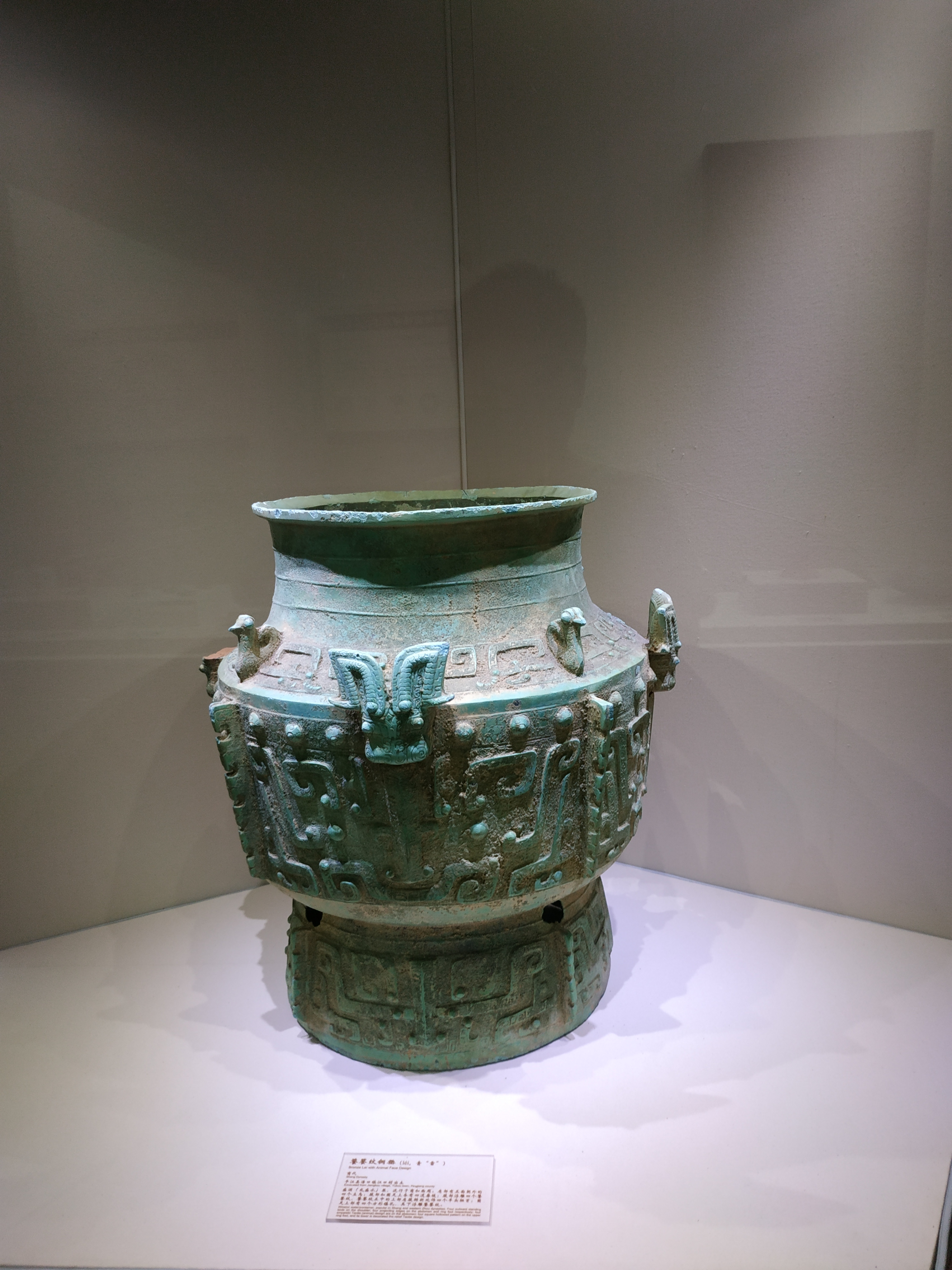
Bronze pot (Lei) with Taotie design, Shang dynasty (1600 BC-1046 BC).

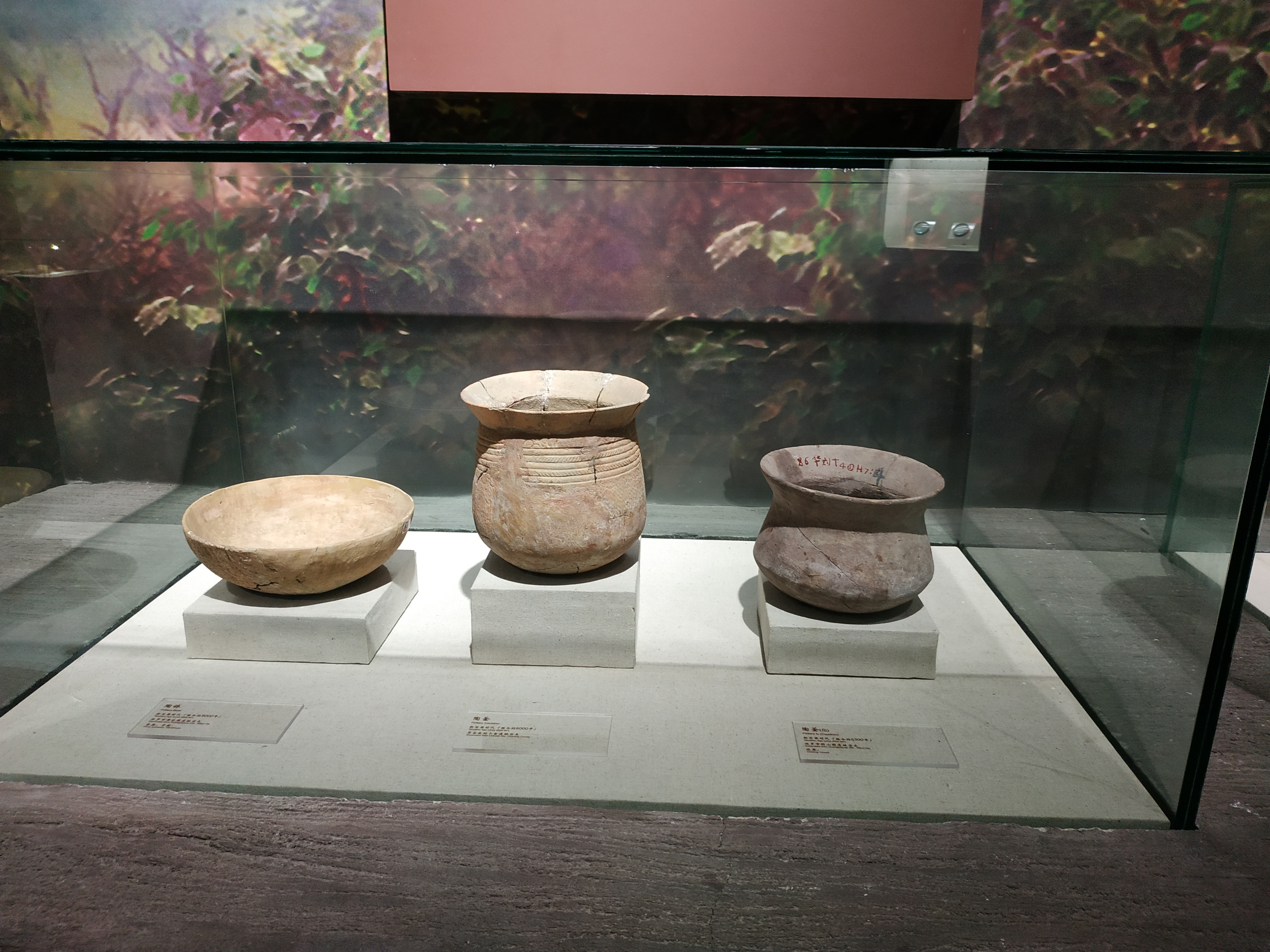
Clay pots, Neolithic Age (about 6,500 years ago).

== See also ==
- List of museums in China
