= Robot Monk Xian'er =

Chinese robot

Robot Monk Xian'er (Chinese: 贤二机器僧) is a humanoid robot based on the cartoon character Xian'er. It was developed by a team of monks, volunteers and AI experts from Beijing Longquan Monastery in Beijing, China. The two-foot (60 cm) tall robot can answer 20 simple questions about Buddhism via a touchscreen mounted in its chest. It can follow human instructions to make body movements, read scriptures and play Buddhist music. It can chat and respond to people's emotional and spiritual questions with Buddhist wisdom.

As a chatbot, Robot Monk Xian'er is available on certain public platforms including WeChat and Facebook. Over the years, master Xuecheng, the abbot of Beijing Longquan Monastery, replied to thousands of questions on Sina Weibo. These questions and their answers become the data source of the chatbot.
