= Shi Yanjue =

Chinese Buddhist monk

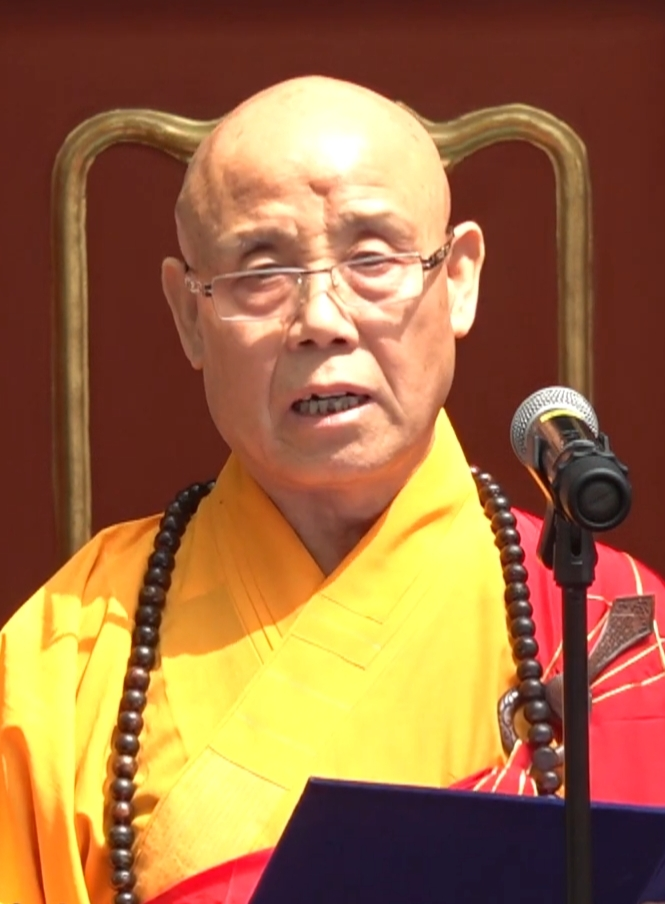
- Title: President of the Buddhist Association of China

Personal life
- Born: April 1956 (age 70) Gangu County, Gansu, China
- Education: Mahachulalongkornrajavidyalaya University

Religious life
- Religion: Chan Buddhism
- Dharma name: Yanjue

Senior posting
- Teacher: Shi Changhui (释常慧)
- Period in office: August 2018-present
- Predecessor: Shi Xuecheng

Military service

Chinese name
- Traditional Chinese: 釋演覺
- Simplified Chinese: 释演觉
Transcriptions
Standard Mandarin
- Hanyu Pinyin: Shì Yǎnjué

Shi Yanjue (Chinese: 释演觉; born April 1956) is a Chinese Buddhist monk and the current president of the Buddhist Association of China, succeeding Shi Xuecheng, who was accused of sexual harassment.

== Biography ==
Shi Yanjue was born in Gangu County, Gansu, in April 1956. In January 1982, he took refuge in the Three Jewels under Shi Changhui (释常慧) at Xiangji Temple in Xi'an, Shaanxi.

In June 2004, he became vice-president of the Buddhist Library of China. On November 5, 2006, he was proposed as the new abbot of Guangji Temple. In 2015 he was vice-president of the Buddhist Association of China, an organization overseen by the United Front Work Department of the Central Committee of the Chinese Communist Party. In May 2016, he received an honorary doctorate in philosophy in Buddhist Studies from the Mahachulalongkornrajavidyalaya University. In August 2018, he was named acting president of the Buddhist Association of China, replacing Shi Xuecheng. On December 2, 2020, he was elected president of the Buddhist Association of China at the 10th National Congress of the Buddhist Association of China.

Buddhist titles
Preceded by Shi Xuecheng	President of the Buddhist Association of China; 2018	Incumbent
