= Geshe Sherab Gyatso =

Tibetan religious teacher and politician

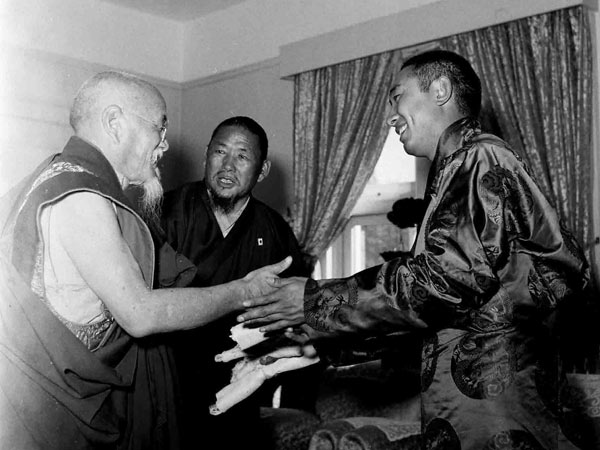

Geshe Sherab Gyatso (Tibetan: དགེ་བཤེས་ཤེས་རབ་རྒྱ་མཚོ།, ZWPY: Gêxê Xêrab Gyamco; simplified Chinese: 喜饶嘉措; traditional Chinese: 喜饒嘉措; pinyin: Xǐráo Jiācuò; 1884–1968) was a Tibetan religious teacher and a politician who served in the Chinese government in the 1950s. After living in Lhasa for a period, he fell from favor with the establishment there in the 1930s and returned to his home in Amdo, an eastern Tibetan area. He associated himself first with the Nationalist Government of the Republic of China and then with the Communists of the People's Republic of China. He held a number of government posts in Tibetan areas under the People's Republic of China. He was also initially the vice-president and later the president of the Buddhist Association of China; the latter position he held until 1966. In 1968, during the Cultural Revolution, Sherab Gyatso's left leg was broken by a Red Guard. On November 1, 1968, he died. After the Gang of Four was arrested, on August 26, 1978, the Qinghai provincial government rehabilitated him.

== Amdo period ==
Born in what is now Xunhua Salar Autonomous County, Qinghai. In 1884 (the 15th Year of the Wooden Monkey in the Tibetan Calendar), Sherab Gyatso was born in a poor Tibetan family in Xunhua, Qinghai. When he was about 7 years old, he was taught the novice precepts by Norbu Gesi at the Gurü (Gulei) Monastery and was officially ordained as a monk, named "Sherab Gyatso", meaning the sea of wisdom. Sherab Gyatso studied Tibetan grammar, Hetuvidyā, Vinaya, etc. in Gurü (Gulei) Monastery and Lde tsha Monastery, following Tome Geshe and Jiangxia Zugu. During this period, Sherab Gyatso's father died. At the age of 14, he went to the Wensi College of Labrang Monastery for further study. Sherab Gyatso successively studied under Tewu Guanque, Gongtang Luo Zhecang, Si Shijia Muxiang, etc., and completed Hetuvidyā, Prajna and other courses with excellent grades. His scripture teacher Gongtang Luo Zhecang received full ordination for Sherab Gyatso. The 21-year-old Sheran Gyatso set off for Lhasa with the help of the sutra teacher.

== Lhasa period ==
In the winter of 1904, Shirab Gyatso arrived in Lhasa and entered the Drepung Monastery in Gansu Province, where he studied under the tutelage of great scholars such as Chozhi Gabu Geshe, Lobsang Yeshe Tenbe Gyaltsen, and devoted himself to the study of Madhyamika and Abhidharmakośa-bhāsya. In the debates of scriptures, the quick-witted Sherab Gyatso was well-known. Due to the rapid progress, Khenpo Guo Mang Zhacang was appointed as the repeater of Zhacang (in various procedures)

In 1916, Sherab Gyatso obtained the qualification to pass the examination of Larenpa Geshe in the debate of scriptures in the three major monasteries in Lhasa. At the subsequent Lhasa Great Prayer Conference, the 32-year-old Sherab got the first place Larenpa Geshe. Then Sherab Gyatso entered the upper and lower tantric schools of Drepung Monastery to study.

Since 1918, at the invitation of the Dalai Lama XIII, Sherab Gyatso completed the collation and printing of 29 copies of the Complete Works of Butön Rinchen Drub in the Norbulingka Palace in six years, which was well received. Then, for eight years, he presided over the revision and engraving of the Potala Palace version of the Tripiṭaka. In addition, Sherab Gyatso also published Diss Sangye Gyatso's book "Sound Temperament".

During the period of Norbulingka Palace, Sherab Gyatso wrote more than ten kinds of works such as "Elucidation of Doubtful Definitions", "Immortal Vajra Thunderbolt" and "Ontology of Merit". In addition, he toured the three major monasteries to teach five great treatises. His monk disciples included Chijiang Renboje, Khenpo Qunpei Gyalpo of Komang Dratsang, Geshe Qiangpa Cicheng, Gendun Qunpei, and Gongpa. Tukten Jitak, Gongsang Lobsang Gyaltsen, etc. Others include Dbangchen Dgelegs (དབང་ཆེན་དགེལེགས), Lcanglocan Bsodnams Rgyalpo(ལྕང་ལོ་ཅན་བསོད་ནམས་རྒྱལ་པོ), Degesai Sonamwangdui, Tsarong Dazang Dradül(ཚ་རོང་ཟླ་བཟང་དགྲ་འདུལ), Ngapoi Ngawang Jigme and so on.

In the autumn of 1934, the "Tibet Tour Group" organized by Li Dan [5] arrived in Lhasa, and then Li Dan and Yang Zhifu followed Sherab Gyatso to study Buddhism. From the end of 1934 to the end of 1936, at the request of Li Dan, Sherab Gyatso started to review and finalize the "Tibetan-Chinese Dictionary" compiled by the Qinghai Tibetan Language Research Society. Later recommended by Li Dan, the government of the Republic of China, through the Ministry of Education and the Mongolian and Tibetan Affairs Commission, hired Sherab Gyatso to go to the Han region to serve as a lecturer on Tibetan culture and a lecturer on Sino-Tibetan culture at the Five National Universities.

== Republic of China period ==
At the end of 1936, Sherab Gyatso, accompanied by Li Dan, Yang Zhifu, Geshe Kelsang Gyatso, Gongbasa Tutenjiza, etc., passed through India, passed through Hong Kong and Shanghai, and arrived in Nanjing in the spring of 1937. Where he was received/met Chaing Kai Shek and other important members of the Kuomintang. In the Central University, China, the Shanghai Great Bodhi Society etc., Sherab Gyatso made many cultural reports, introducing Master Tsongkhapa, the order of the Tao, the history of the Gelug school, etc., during which Yang Zhifu served as the translator. His lectures in various colleges and universities were well received.

In 1937, Sherab Gyatso joined the Kuomintang and served as a member of the National Political Council. After the full-scale outbreak of the Japanese Resistance War, Sherab Gyatso went to Gansu and Qinghai in 1939 to actively promote national salvation and resistance to Japan. In many public occasions, Sherab Gyatso enthusiastically encouraged his compatriots to fight against resistance and save the country. In 1940, the Kuomintang named Sherab Gyatso as "Auxiliary Teacher Xuanji Chan Master" because of his "sincere protection of the country, deep worthy of Jiashang" (护国精诚，深堪嘉尚), along with two large and small silver seals.

In 1941, the political situation in Tibet changed, and the third Daza Awang Songrao (Daza, Tibetan: སྟག་བྲག་ནག་དབང་གསུང་རབ།) replaced Rezhen as regent, and Sino-Tibetan relations from there on, began to deteriorate. In 1942, Sherab Gyatso attended the third National Political Participation Council of the Kuomintang. In 1943, Chiang Kai-shek sent Sherab Gyatso to Lhasa, intending to win the favor of the big monastery for the Nationalist government. However, after negotiation by all parties in Tibet, it was decided that only Sherab Gyatso would be allowed to enter Tibet alone. Sherab Gyatso and his fifty followers had to stop at Nagqu on the northern border of Tibet. In 1945, Sherab Gyatso was appointed as a representative of the National Congress. On July 23, 1947, the National Government appointed Sheran Gyatso and Serengdongrub (Bai Yun-ti) as vice-chairmen of the Mongolian and Tibetan Affairs Commission. In the same year, the fifth generation of the master of the Labrang Monastery in Xiahe County, Gansu, Jamyang Zhépa died, and Sherab Gyatso went to offer condolences on behalf of the National Government.

== People's Republic of China period ==
After the founding of the People's Republic of China, at the invitation of the Qinghai Navy Political Quarterly Committee, Sherab Gyatso returned to Xining from Saizong Temple in Hainan, Qinghai Province, and began to cooperate with the Communist Party. In December 1949, the Qinghai Provincial People's Government was established, and Sherab Gyatso served as the vice chairman. In addition, he also successively served as the director of the provincial cultural and educational committee, a member of the Northwest Military and Political Committee, and the deputy director of the Northwest Ethnic Affairs Committee.Before the People's Liberation Army entered Tibet, and the Sino-Tibetan war began, the People's Government had sent a peace mission to Tibet including Sherab Gyatso, hoping that Tibet would return to the motherland.

On October 5, 1950, the Battle of Qamdo broke out, the Tibetan Army was defeated, the head of Qamdo Ngapoi Ngawang Jigme was captured, and the door to Lhasa was opened. On May 23, 1951, the Tibetan delegation headed by Ngapoi signed the Seventeen Point Agreement in Beijing. This year, Sherab Gyatso went to Beijing and was received by Mao Tse-tung and Zhou Enlai. Mao Tse-tung also gave him a car and several radios. In the autumn of 1951, Sherab Gyatso personally came to the Jianzhaangla area of Qinghai to do the work of organizing and settling a thousand Tibetan households. In 1952, when there was a riot in the Baimai area of Xikang, Sherab Gyatso published "The Book of the Holy Land Refuting the Bodi Baima", "The Light of the Wisdom of the Sun to Refute the False Prophecy, Sweeping the Darkness and Mist", "The Precursor Letter - Nectar Pearl", etc. Articles to assist the government in advocating policies. Mao Tse-tung, Liu Shaoqi and other state leaders have praised Sherab Gyatso for his contribution to national unity.

In November 1952, Sherab Gyatso and Xuyun, Yuanying, Zhao Puchu and others initiated the establishment of the Chinese Buddhist Association. At the end of May 1953, the inaugural meeting of the Buddhist Association of China was held in Beijing, Yuanying was elected as the president, and Sherab Gyatso was the vice president. In September, Yuanying died, and Sherab Gyatso was appointed as the acting president of the Chinese Buddhist Association. In 1954, he was elected to the First National People's Congress. In September, he attended the first session of the first National People's Congress to discuss the draft constitution, during which he made a speech. In 1955, at the second council meeting of the Chinese Buddhist Association, Sherab Gyatso officially became the president. In September 1956, the Buddhist Academy of China was established, with Sherab Gyatso serving as the dean and teaching for the students of the Buddhist Academy. In November 1956, Sherab Gyatso led a Chinese delegation to attend the 4th World Buddhist Friendship Association held in [[Kathmandu, Nepal]], and Sherab Gyatso was elected as the vice-chairman of the World Buddhist Association.

From 1956 to 1958, as the Chinese Communist Party carried out large-scale "socialist transformation" in Tibetan areas in Qinghai, Sichuan, Gansu, and Yunnan, the Sino-Tibetan conflict gradually escalated and gradually spread to Lhasa. In March 1959, the Lhasa incident broke out, and then the Dalai Lama and tens of thousands of Tibetans went into exile in India. In this regard, Sherab Gyatso delivered a speech, firmly supporting the government and opposing "Tibetan separatist movements".

In 1960, in order to commend Sherab Gyatso's achievements, the State Council of the People's Republic of China specially presented a large bronze bell weighing more than 2,000 kilograms from the Ming Dynasty to Sherab Gyatso and sent a special vehicle to Gulei Temple in Xunhua, Qinghai. The Qinghai Provincial People's Government allocated 110,000 yuan to build a bell tower. In July 1962, Sherab Gyatso returned to Gulei Monastery and presided over the inauguration ceremony of the bell tower.

Sherab Gyatso is also actively engaged in the translation of Tibetan, proofreading the "Common Program" of the Chinese People's Political Consultative Conference, guiding the translation of the 1954 Constitution of the People's Republic of China, and participating in the translation and revision of "Selected Works of Mao Zedong".

In June 1961, the Buddha's Tooth Attendant Group headed by Sherab Gyatso was invited to support the Buddha's tooth to Sri Lanka, and was warmly welcomed by the Sri Lankan government and people. In November 1961, the 6th World Buddhist Fellowship was held in Phnom Penh, the capital of Cambodia. Sherab Gyatso once again led a Chinese Buddhist delegation to attend and shook hands with the monks and kings of the two Cambodian factions. At the World Buddhist Friendship Conference, the Chinese delegation proposed to revoke the resolution made at the last conference to accept the "Buddhist Association of China" as the regional center, but it was rejected, and the Buddhist Association of China immediately withdrew. In February 1962, the 3rd National Congress of the Buddhist Association of China was held in Beijing, and Sherab Gyatso took over as the chairman.

Although Sherab Gyatso supported the government to suppress the rebellion by force if necessary, he was often able to express his views bluntly at public meetings about some major policy mistakes of the government, and some of his words could be described as fierce. is rare. At the National Work Conference held in Beijing from April 21 to May 29, 1962, Sherab Gyatso made a sharp criticism of the leadership of the Chinese Communist Party: "I want to tell the truth today, you have some practices. It's too unpopular. You did what Chiang Kai-shek and Ma Bufang did not do... You always like to avoid substantive issues and play numbers games... I will also learn from you, using a few numbers, to talk about your problems in the past few years: The first is telling lies, the second is not admitting mistakes, the third is messing with people, the fourth is lacking the Buddha's mind, and there is no humane way…". (The personnel who translated his words at the Conference were once afraid to do translation work)

In October 1964, a conference to criticize Sherab Gyatso was held at the Beijing Buddhist Academy, and Sherab Gyatso was charged with various charges, such as "connecting with foreign countries", "backbone of a treasonous group", "colluding in rebellion", "developing 'Reactionary Program'" and so on (he was innocent and these were baseless charges that many other prominent Community Party officials similarly faced during the "Cultural Revolution"). Sherab Gyatso protested against this, but the criticism gradually escalated, and Sherab Gyatso was later quarantined and censored. At the end of 1964, Sherab Gyatso, who was already eighty years old, was sent back to Qinghai and continued to be criticized in Xunhua. In Xining, the "Exhibition on the Crimes of the Anti-Party and Treason Group of Sherab Gyatso" was also held. [10] In 1966, when the Cultural Revolution broke out, Sherab Gyatso was beaten and one of his legs was broken. On November 1, 1968, Sherab Gyatso was tortured to death in prison. In 1979, Sherab Gyatso was rehabilitated. On October 6, the Qinghai Provincial Government held a memorial meeting for Sherab Gyatso in Xining.

== Publication ==
About fifteen manuscripts of Sherab Gyatso's lectures in Lhasa were brought to Nanjing in 1936 and stored in the Ganqingning Hall, but were bombed by Japanese aircraft in 1937. After he came to the mainland, his writings were burned down during the Cultural Revolution. Therefore, the remaining works of Sherab Gyatso are relatively few.

-The Collected Works of Master Sherab, Volumes 1, 2 and 3, published from 1982 to 1984 《喜饶大师文集》

-"An Introduction to Tibetan Culture" 《藏族文化概论》

== This article may not be complete, refer to these other links for more context ==
Buddhist titles
Preceded by Yuan Ying	Venerable Master of the Buddhist Association of China; 1957–1980	Succeeded by Zhao Puchu
