= Shi Yuanying =

Chinese Chan Buddhist master (1878–1953)

- 释圆瑛
- Title: Venerable Master of the Buddhist Association of China

Personal life
- Born: Wu Changfa (吴昌发); Wu Hengchun (吴亨春); 1878 Gutian County, Fujian, Qing China
- Died: 12 September 1953 (aged 74–75) Tiantong Temple, Ningbo, Zhejiang, China
- Parent: Yuan Yun (father)
- Posthumous name: Tao Guang (韬光); Yihoutang Zhuren (一吼堂主人)

Religious life
- Religion: Chan Buddhism
- School: Linji school
- Lineage: 40th generation
- Dharma name: Hong Wu (宏悟)

Senior posting
- Teacher: Zeng Xi; Miao Lian; Da Gong; Ye Kai; Bazhi Toutuo
- Period in office: 1953
- Successor: Geshe Sherab Gyatso
- Students: Ming Yang

Chinese name
- Traditional Chinese: 釋圓瑛
- Simplified Chinese: 释圆瑛
Transcriptions
Standard Mandarin
- Hanyu Pinyin: Shì Yuányīng

Birth name
- Traditional Chinese: 吳昌發 or 吳亨春
- Simplified Chinese: 吴昌发 or 吴亨春
Transcriptions
Standard Mandarin
- Hanyu Pinyin: Wú Chāngfā or Wú Hēngchūn

Dharma name
- Chinese: 宏悟
Transcriptions
Standard Mandarin
- Hanyu Pinyin: Hóngwù

Art name
- Traditional Chinese: 韜光
- Simplified Chinese: 韬光
Transcriptions
Standard Mandarin
- Hanyu Pinyin: Tāoguāng

Art name (also)
- Chinese: 一吼堂主人
Transcriptions
Standard Mandarin
- Hanyu Pinyin: Yīhǒutáng Zhǔrén

Shi Yuanying (Chinese: 释圆瑛; 1878 – 12 September 1953) was a Chinese Chan Buddhist master and the first Venerable Master of the Buddhist Association of China.

== Biography ==
Yuanying was born Wu Changfa (吳昌發) and Wu Hengchun (吳亨春) into a family of farming background in Pinghu Township of Gutian County, in Fujian province, in 1878. His parents died when he was six and then he lived with his uncle. At the age of 10, he aspired to become a Buddhist monk, but his uncle did not approve. By age 18, he attended the Imperial examination and became a xiucai. One year later, he received ordination as a monk at Meifeng Temple in Fuzhou under master Zeng Xi (增西上人) and then received prātimokṣa under master Miao Lian (妙蓮老和尚) at Yongquan Temple. When he was 21, he began to learn Chan Buddhism under master Ye Kai (冶開老和尚), he stayed with his teacher for four years. At the age of 25, he resided in Tiantong Temple with his teacher Bazhi Toutuo (八指頭陀).

In 1908, he settled at Yongquan Temple, in Quanzhou, where he taught Chan Buddhism, and attracted large numbers of practitioners. In 1909, he became the abbot of Jiedai Temple. In 1912, the Chinese Buddhist Association was founded and he was elected a councilor. In 1917, Yuanying was elected Venerable Master of the Buddhist Association of Ningbo, he establish two schools to promote the development of local education project. He spread Chan Buddhism in Beijing in 1920 and then in Singapore and Penang Island in 1922. In 1923, Yuanying returned to Quanzhou, he rebuilt the Kaiyuan Temple and founded kindergarten in the temple, which adopted more than 200 orphans. In 1926, Yuanying went to Southeast Asia again to collect donations. In 1928, the Nationalist government issued the "Administrative Regulations of Religious Temples", an Anti - Buddhism Movement swept over the country. In 1929, along with Taixu and others, Yuanying formed the China Buddhist Association in Shanghai, where he was president. They signed a large petition calling for stopping the destruction of Buddhism. In 1930, Yuanying became the abbot of Tiantong Temple, where he taught Chan Buddhism for six years. In 1937, he was the abbot of Yongquan Temple, at the age of 60. On July 7, the Marco Polo Bridge Incident broke out, Yuanying organized an ambulance corps for to serve the Nationalists. In October, he went to Singapore to collect money for the military expenditures. In the autumn of 1939, Yuanying returned to Shanghai and settled at Yuanming Lecture Room (圓明講堂), he was soon arrested by the Japanese military police corps, he was mistreated and tortured. Shanghai people from all walks of life to rescue him, under pressure, the Japanese had to release him. In 1943 former Beiyang government prime minister Jin Yunpeng invited him to Tianjin to preach. In 1945, he founded the Yuanming Lengyan School (圓明楞嚴專宗學院), where he served as president and expound the texts of Śūraṅgama Sūtra.

After the establishment of the Communist State in 1951, Yuanying attended the Asia and Pacific Regional Peace Conference in Beijing. In 1953, Hsu Yun formed the Buddhist Association of China at Kuang Chi (Extensive Aid) Monastery, Yuanying was elected its first Venerable Master. On September 12, he died of esophagus cancer at Tiantong Temple, in Ningbo, Zhejiang province, aged 76.

Buddhist titles
New title	Venerable Master of the Buddhist Association of China; May–September 1953	Succeeded by Geshe Sherab Gyatso
