= Guangji =

Guangji may refer to:

- Guangji County, former name of Wuxue, city in Hubei, China
- Guangji Temple, in Beijing, China
