= Shi Chuanyin =

Chinese Buddhist monk (1927–2023)

- 释传印
- Title: Venerable Master of the Buddhist Association of China

Personal life
- Born: Lü Yudai (吕毓岱); 30 January 1927 Zhuanghe, Liaoning, China
- Died: 11 March 2023 (aged 96) Donglin Temple, Jiujiang, Jiangxi, China
- Education: Buddhist Academy of China; Bukkyo University

Religious life
- Religion: Chan Buddhism
- School: Weiyang school
- Lineage: 9th generationof Weiyang school
- Dharma names: Chuanyin

Senior posting
- Teacher: Chongren; Hsu Yun
- Period in office: 2010-2015
- Predecessor: Yicheng
- Successor: Xuecheng

Chinese name
- Traditional Chinese: 釋傳印
- Simplified Chinese: 释传印
Transcriptions
Standard Mandarin
- Hanyu Pinyin: Shì Chuányìn

Birth name
- Traditional Chinese: 呂毓岱
- Simplified Chinese: 吕毓岱
Transcriptions
Standard Mandarin
- Hanyu Pinyin: Lǚ Yùdài

Courtesy name
- Traditional Chinese: 月川
- Simplified Chinese: 月川
Transcriptions
Standard Mandarin
- Hanyu Pinyin: Yuèchuān

Dharma names
- Traditional Chinese: 宣傳
- Simplified Chinese: 宣传
Transcriptions
Standard Mandarin
- Hanyu Pinyin: Xuānchuán

Shi Chuanyin (simplified Chinese: 释传印; traditional Chinese: 釋傳印; pinyin: Chuányìn; 30 January 1927 – 11 March 2023) was a Chinese Buddhist monk, Chan master and religious leader. He was best known as Venerable Master of the Buddhist Association of China.

== Early life ==
Chuanyin was born Lü Yudai (吕毓岱) in Zhuanghe, Liaoning, on 30 January 1927.

== Religious life ==
In 1947, he took refuge in the Three Jewels under the master Chongren (崇仁), and received complete ordination under Xuyun, in Zhenru Chan Temple, in 1955, as the 9th generation of the Guiyang school.

In September 1960, he entered the Buddhist Academy of China, where he graduated in September 1965. After graduation, he was assigned to Zhenru Chan Temple.

In 1966, the Cultural Revolution was launched by Mao Zedong, he was transferred to a reclamation farm in Yunjushan as a farmer. After the Cultural Revolution, he regained his identity as a monk.

In the autumn of 1978, he settled at Guoqing Temple in Tiantai County, Zhejiang.

In December 1979, he was transferred to the Buddhist Association of China in Beijing.

In the Spring of 1981, he pursued advanced studies in Japan, where he graduated from Bukkyo University in December 1983.

He was appointed dean of the Buddhist Academy of China, in 1984, becoming vice president in 1986.

In August 1991, he resided in Fangguang Temple in Mount Tiantai. Three years later, he served as abbot of Donglin Temple in Mount Lu.

In February 1999, he became the president of the Buddhist Association of Beijing.

On 3 February 2010, Chuanyin replaced Yicheng to become Venerable Master of the Buddhist Association of China. On 22 October that same year, he was elected a member of the 11th National Committee of the Chinese People's Political Consultative Conference.

In March 2013, he was elected a Standing Committee member of the 12th National Committee of the Chinese People's Political Consultative Conference.

== Death ==
Chuanyin died on 11 March 2023, at Donglin Temple, in Jiujiang, Jiangxi, at the age of 96.

Buddhist titles
Preceded by Shi Yicheng	Venerable Master of the Buddhist Association of China; 2010–2015	Succeeded by Shi Xuecheng
