= Xixin Chan Temple =

Buddhist temple in Hunan, China

- 洗心禅寺
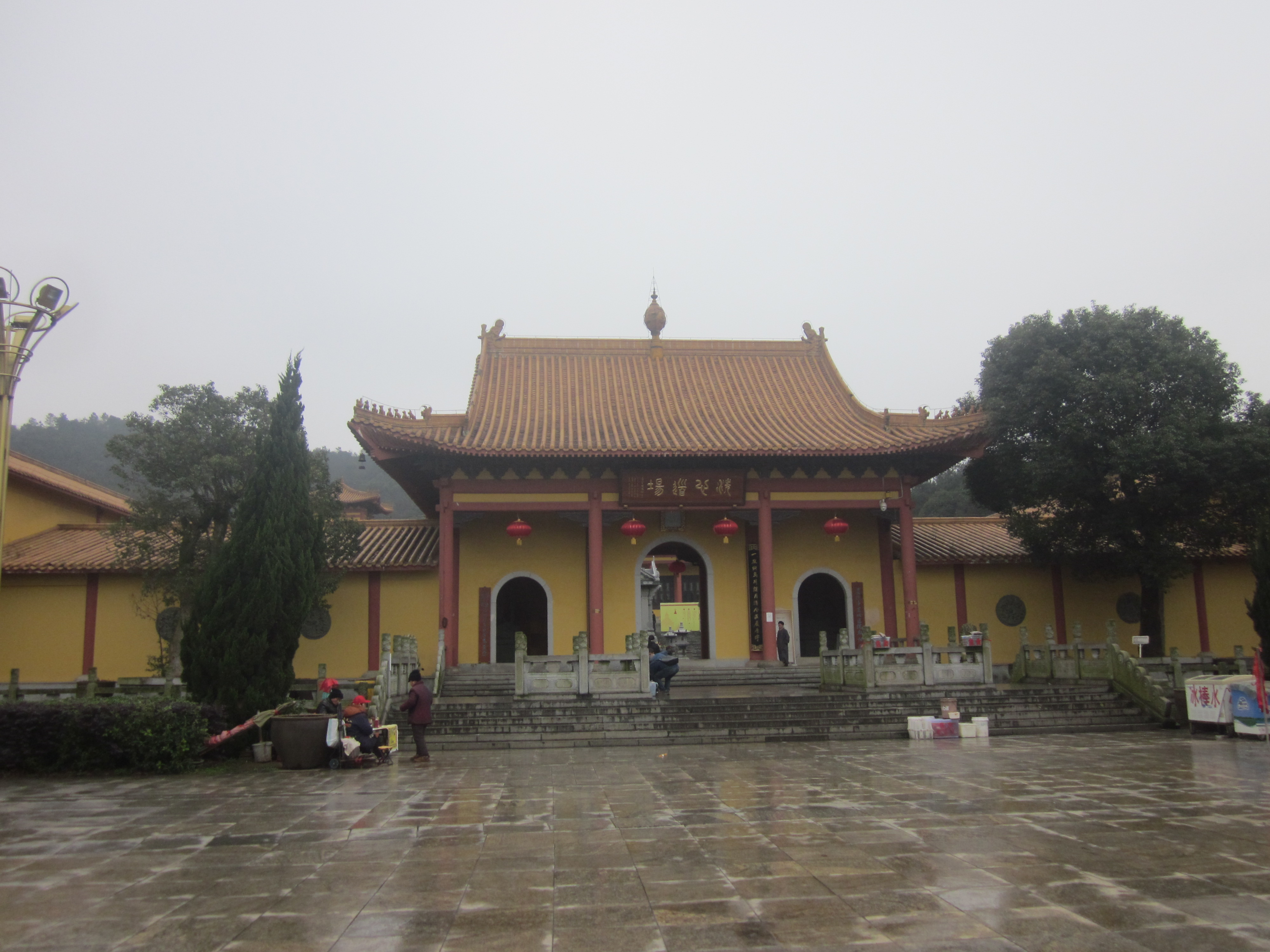
- Shanmen, Xixin Chan Temple.

- Location within Hunan Location within China

Religion
- Affiliation: Buddhism
- Sect: Chan - Linji school
- District: Wangcheng District
- Prefecture: Changsha
- Province: Hunan

Location
- Country: China
- Interactive map of Xixin Chan Temple
- Prefecture: Changsha
- Coordinates: 28°17′4.20″N 112°51′52.91″E

Architecture
- Founder: Hanyue Fazang
- Established: 1620

Xixin Chan Temple or Soul Refreshing Chan Temple (simplified Chinese: 洗心禅寺; traditional Chinese: 洗心禪寺; pinyin: Xǐxīn Chán Sì) is a Buddhist temple located at the foot of Mount Gaoding (高顶山), Wangcheng District, which is 8-square-kilometre (3.1 sq mi) north of Changsha.

== History ==
According to the record of Shanhua County Annals (《善化县志》), the temple was first built by Chan Master Hanyue Fazang (汉月法藏) in the 48th Year (1620) of Emperor Wanli (1573–1620) in the Ming dynasty (1368–1644) with the name Xixin An (洗心庵; Soul Refreshing Temple).

During the Republic of China (1912-1949), the temple was on a noble scale, it has 107 houses, 70 monks and over 400 mu lands.

During the Great Leap Forward, Xixin Chan Temple was completely destroyed.

At the beginning of 21st century, the Venerable Master Yi Cheng, swore to have the temple rebuilt. In September 2002, he appointed his close disciple, Shi Wusheng (释悟圣), as his deputy and told him to manage the rebuilding. In December 2006, the 1st phase ended at the coast of nearly 50 million RMB yuan, the temple covered an area of 360,000-square-metre (3,900,000 sq ft) and had buildings with a floor area of over 30,000-square-metre (320,000 sq ft).

On February 24, 2008, the temple invited a Four-faced Brahma from Thailand, a national treasure enshrined by the Thai First Generation Emperor Charity Fund.

== Architecture ==
The temple at the foot of Mount Gaoding. The temple consists of 14 buildings. The complex includes the following halls: Shanmen, Mahavira Hall, Hall of Four Heavenly Kings, Bell tower, Drum tower, Founder's Hall, Dharma Hall, Dining Room, etc.

== Famous monks ==
- Fazang
- Yi Cheng
- Shi Wusheng

== Gallery ==
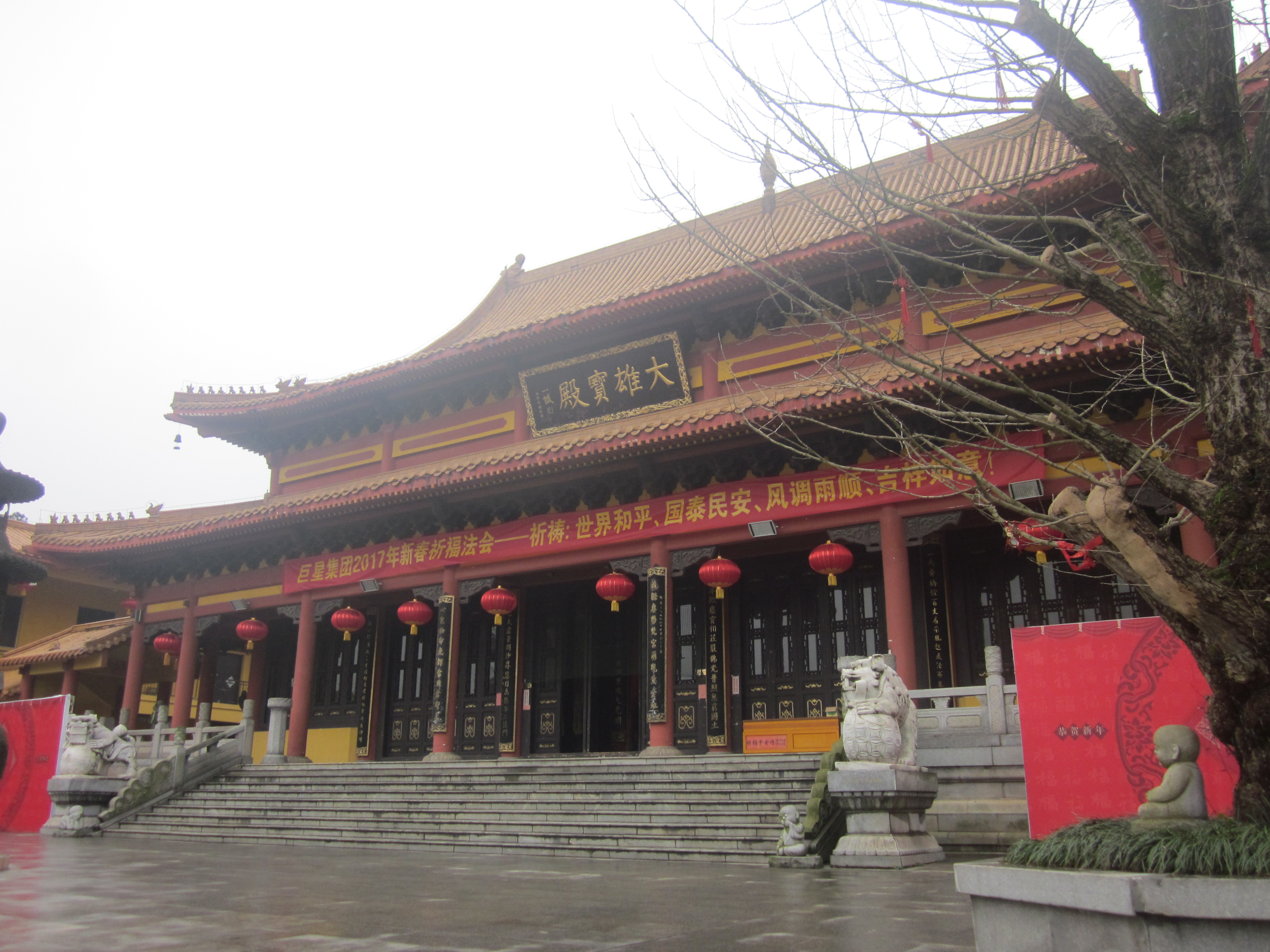
Mahavira Hall.

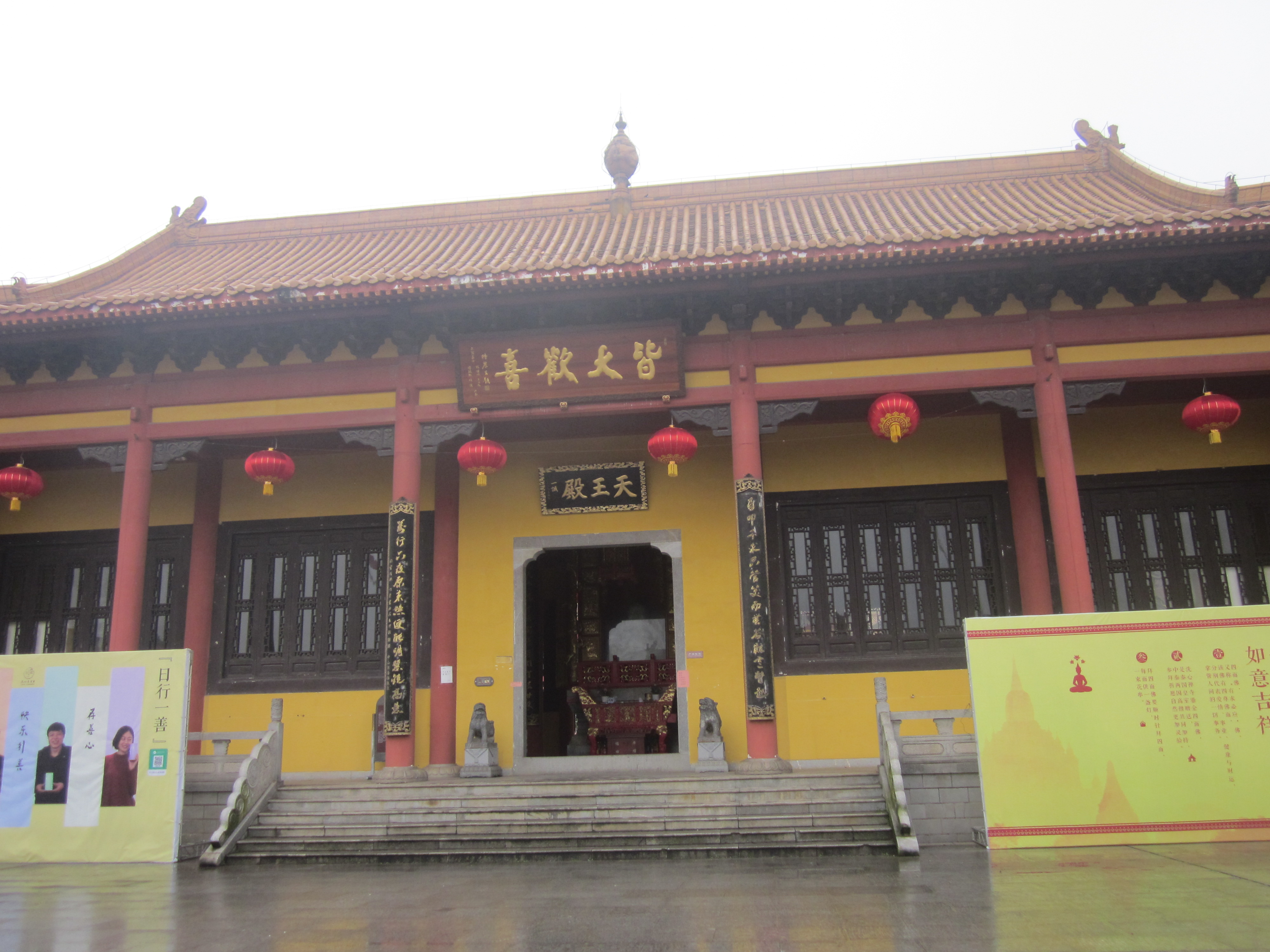
Four Heavenly Kings Hall.

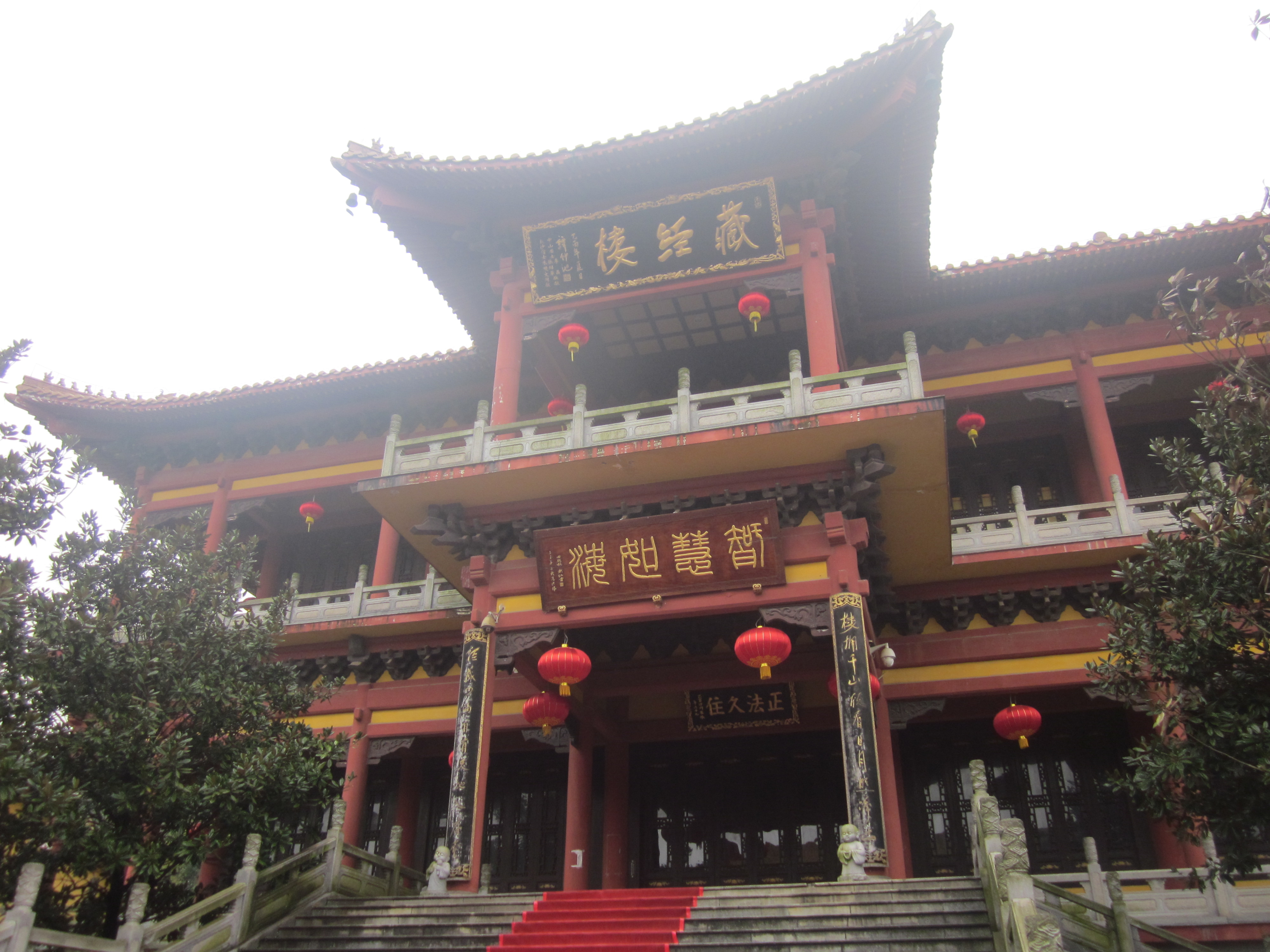
Buddhist Texts Library

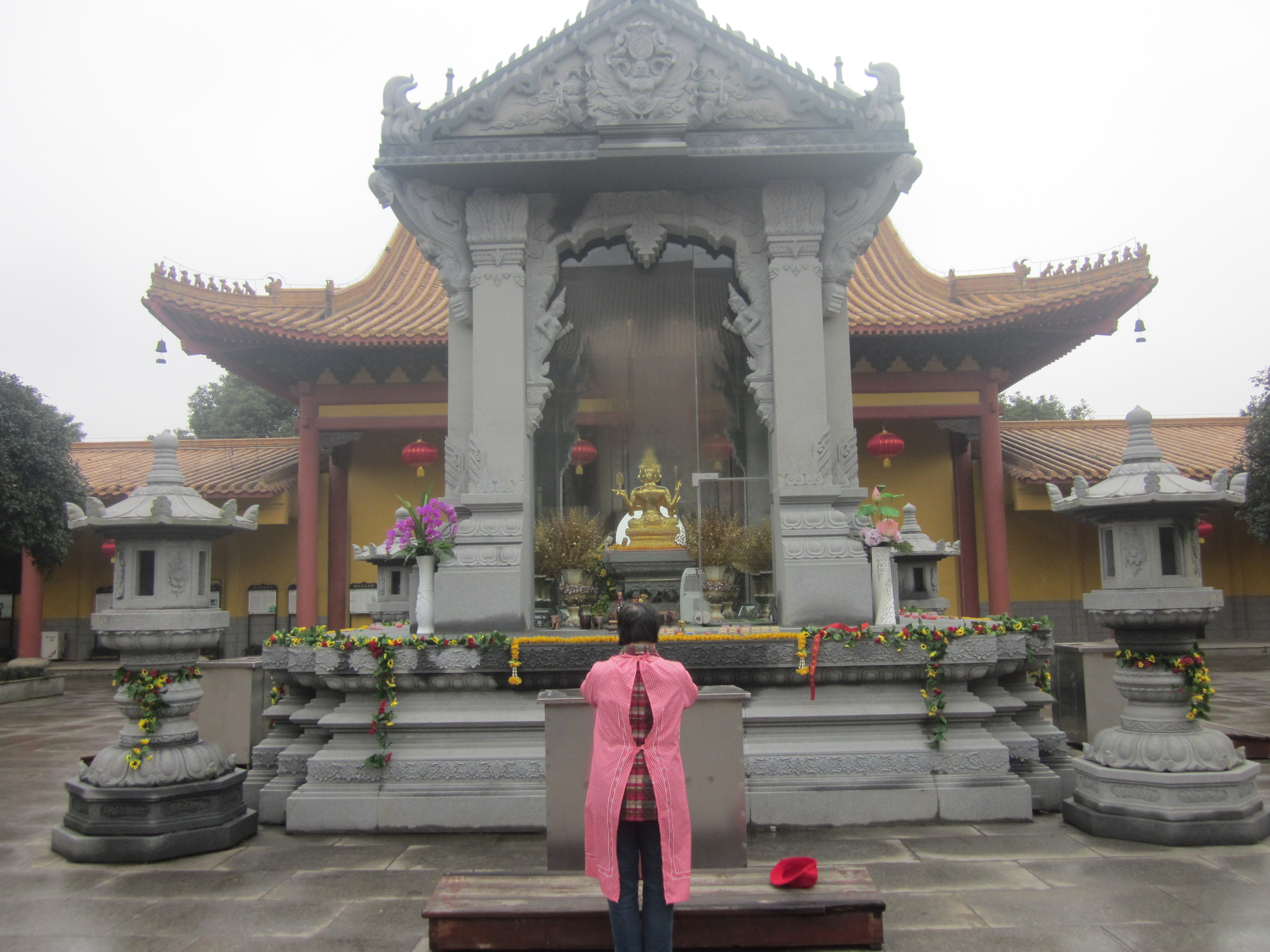
Restored Brahma statue from Thailand at Erawan Shrine, Xixin Chan Temple.

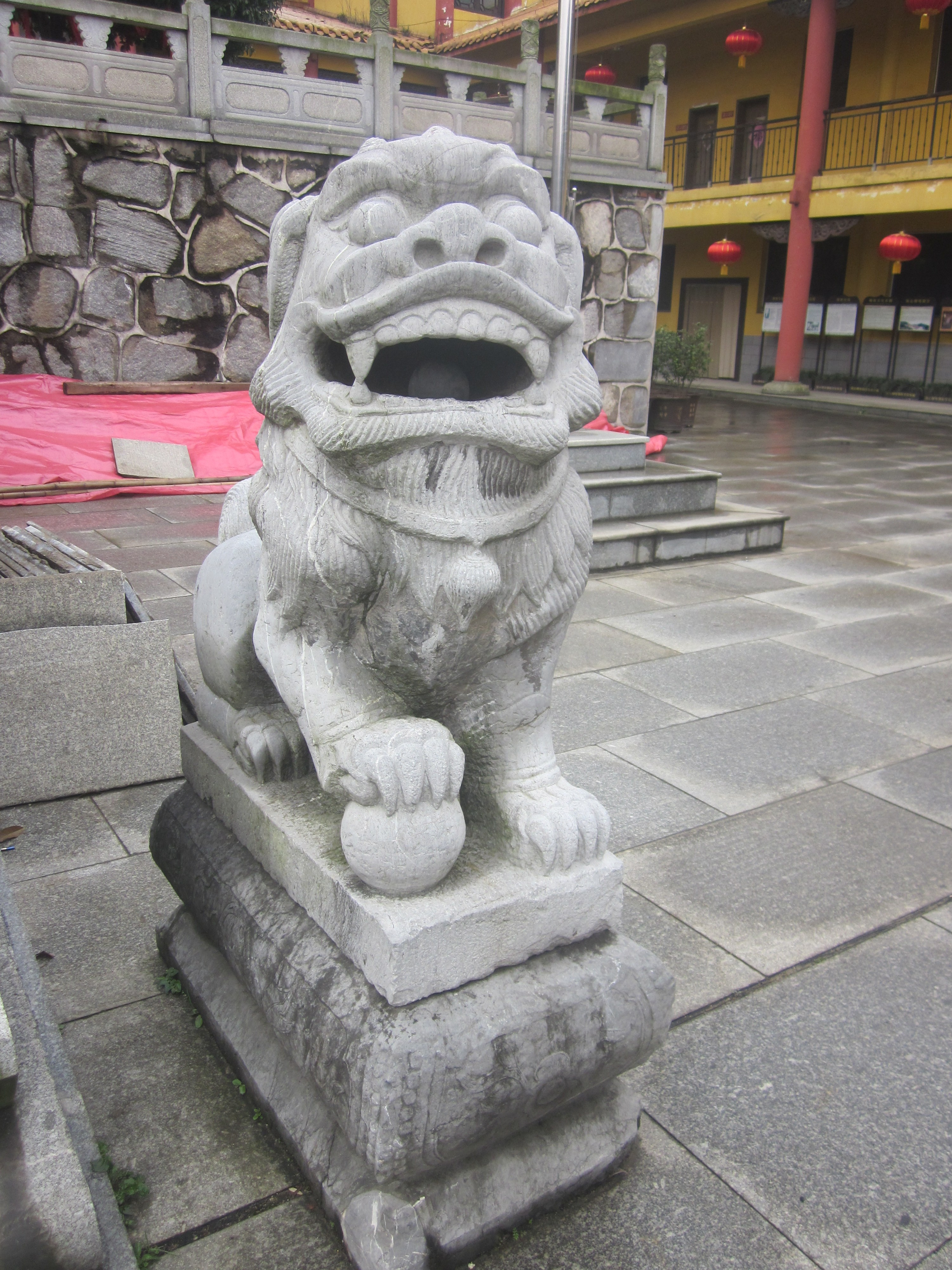
A Chinese guardian lion at Xixin Chan Temple.

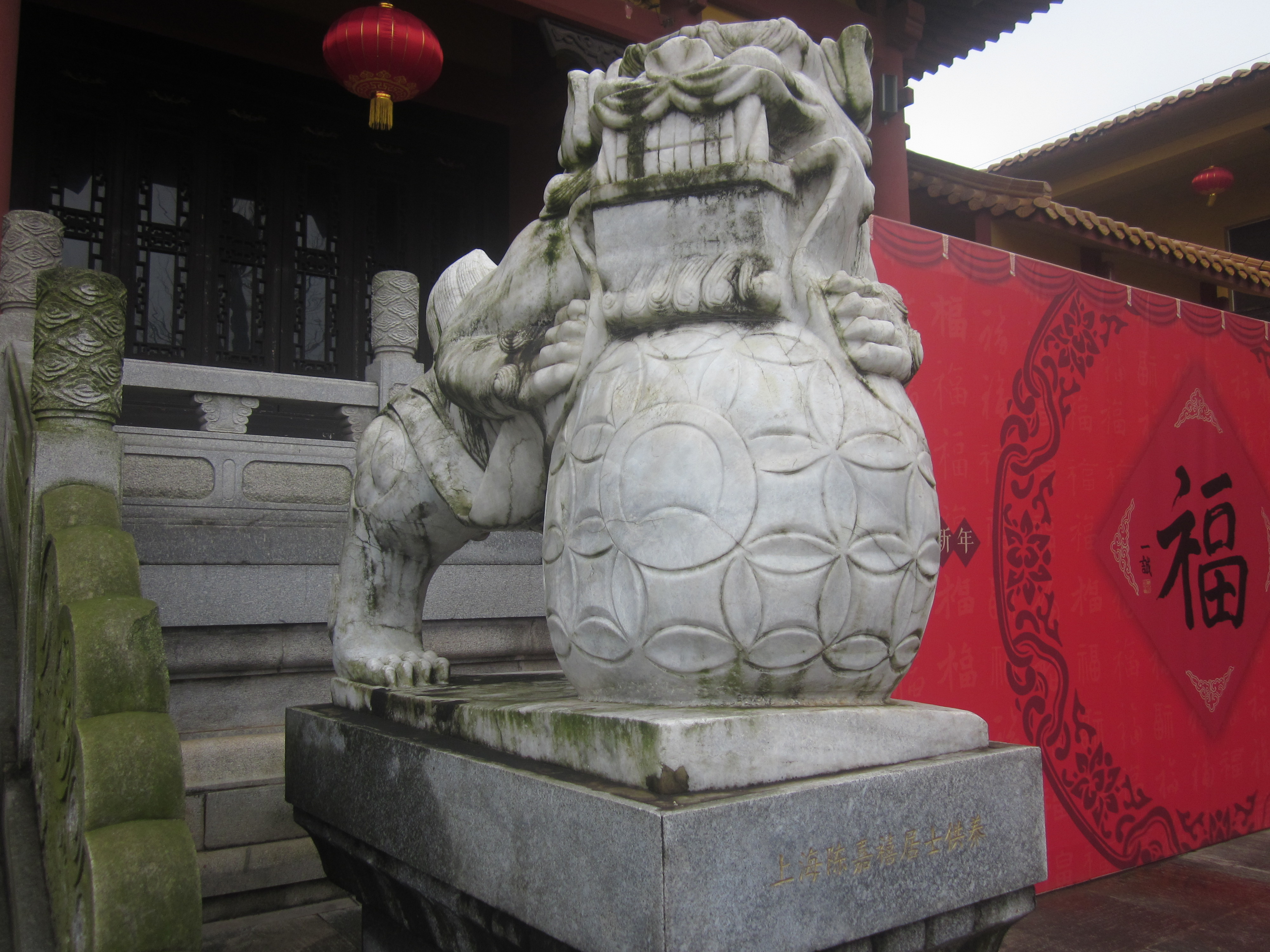
A statue of Pixiu at Xixin Chan Temple.

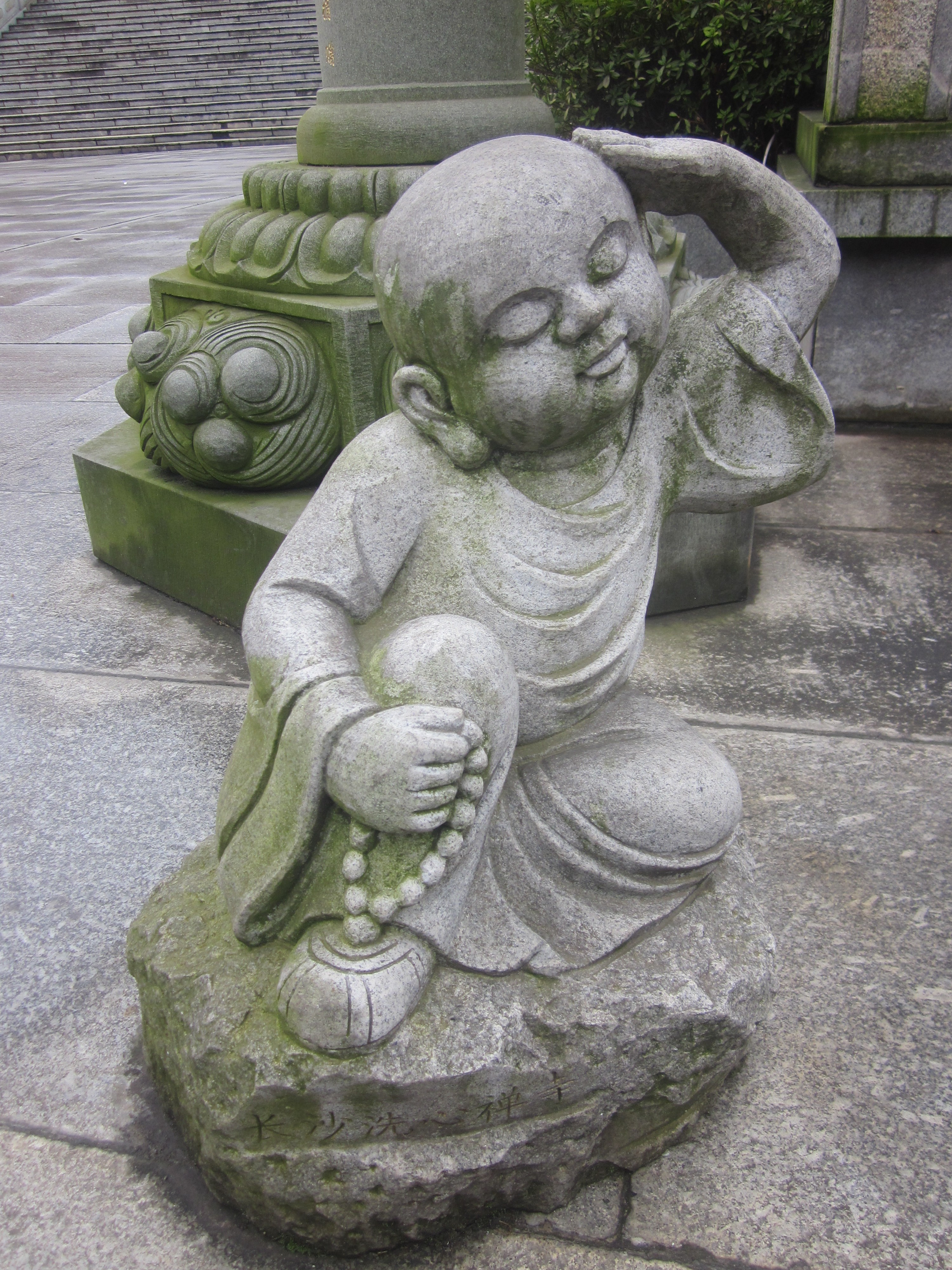
A statue of Arhat at Xixin Chan Temple.

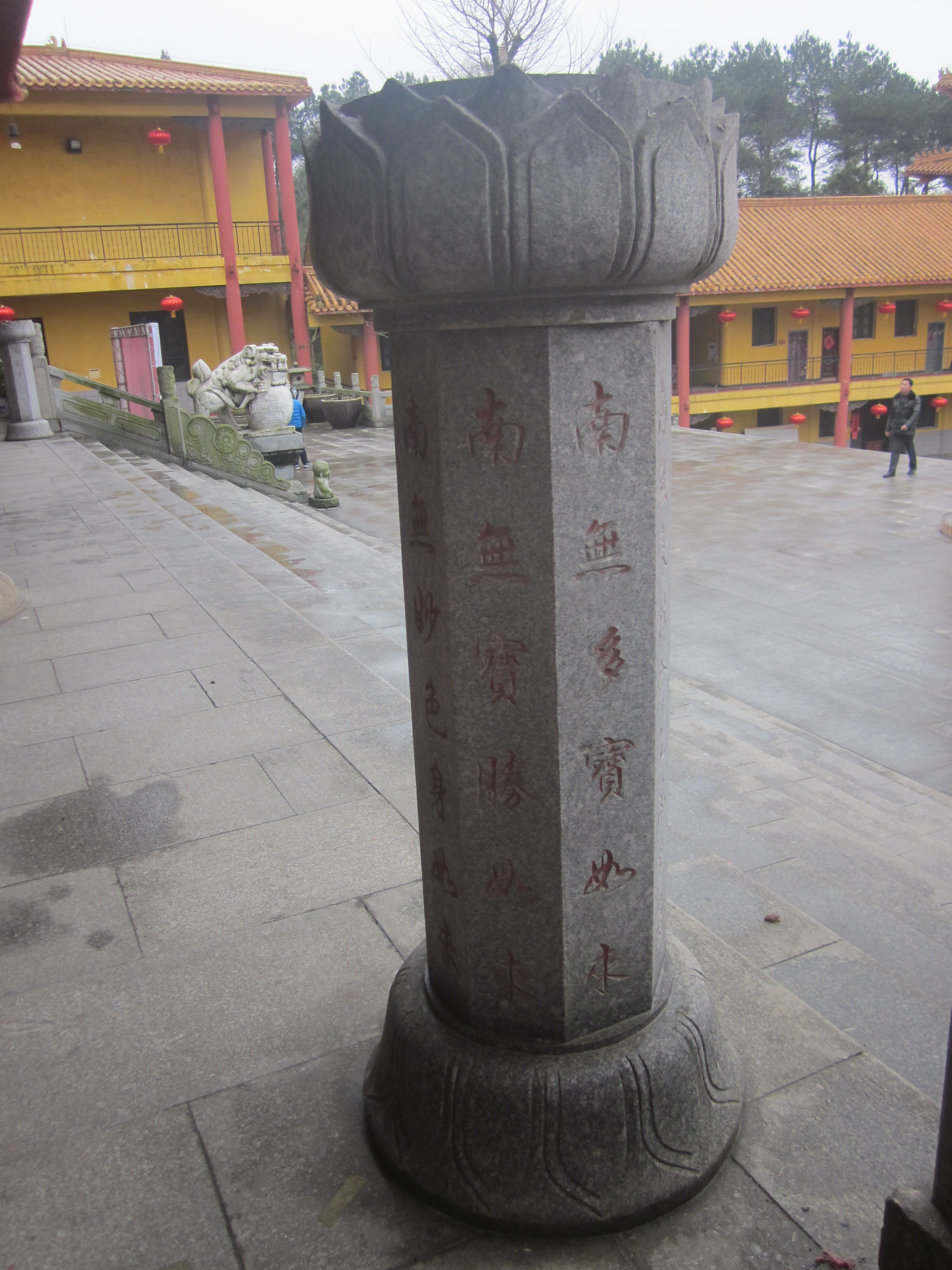
A stone lantern in Xixin Chan Temple.

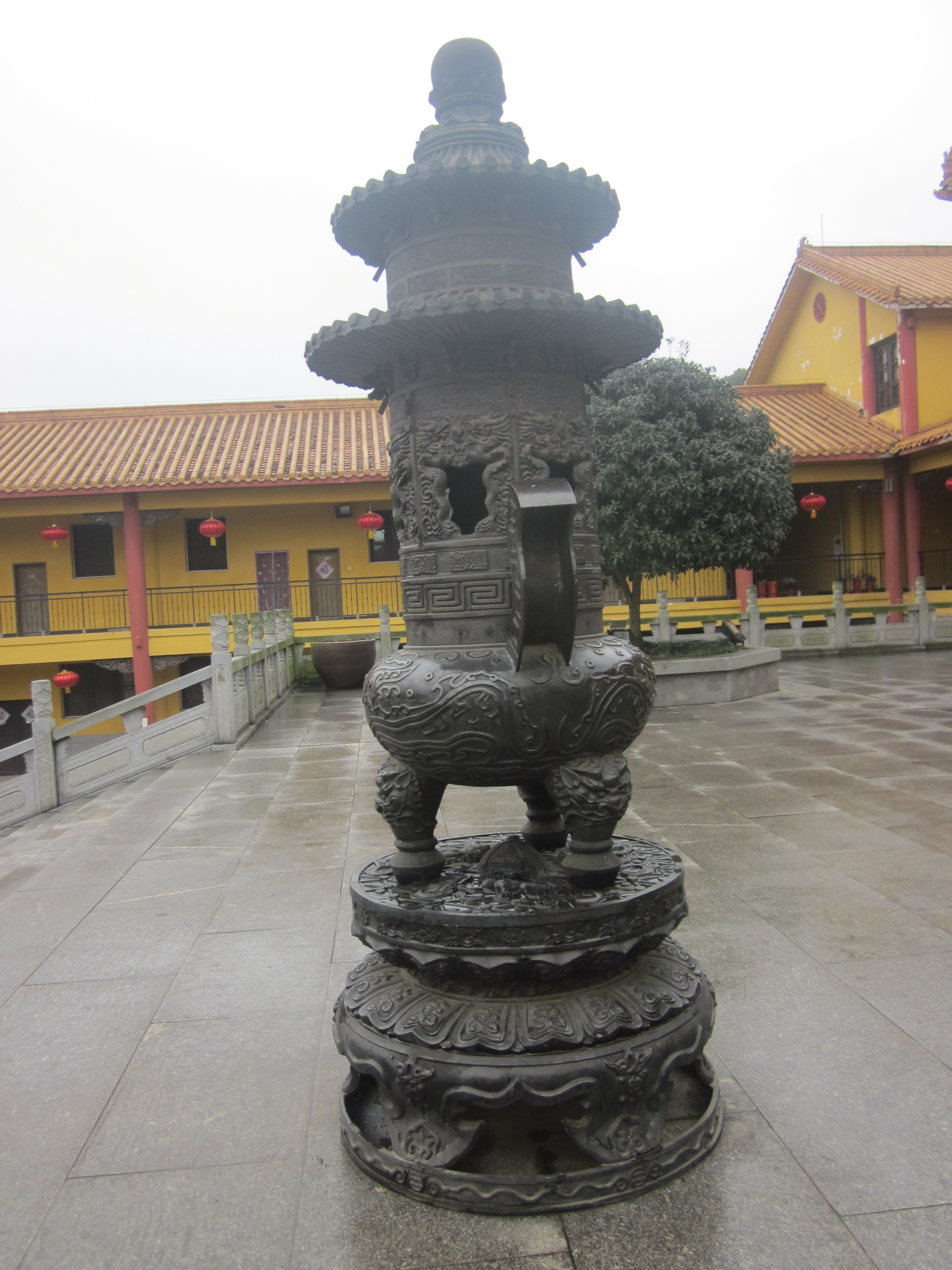
A xianglu at Xixin Chan Temple.

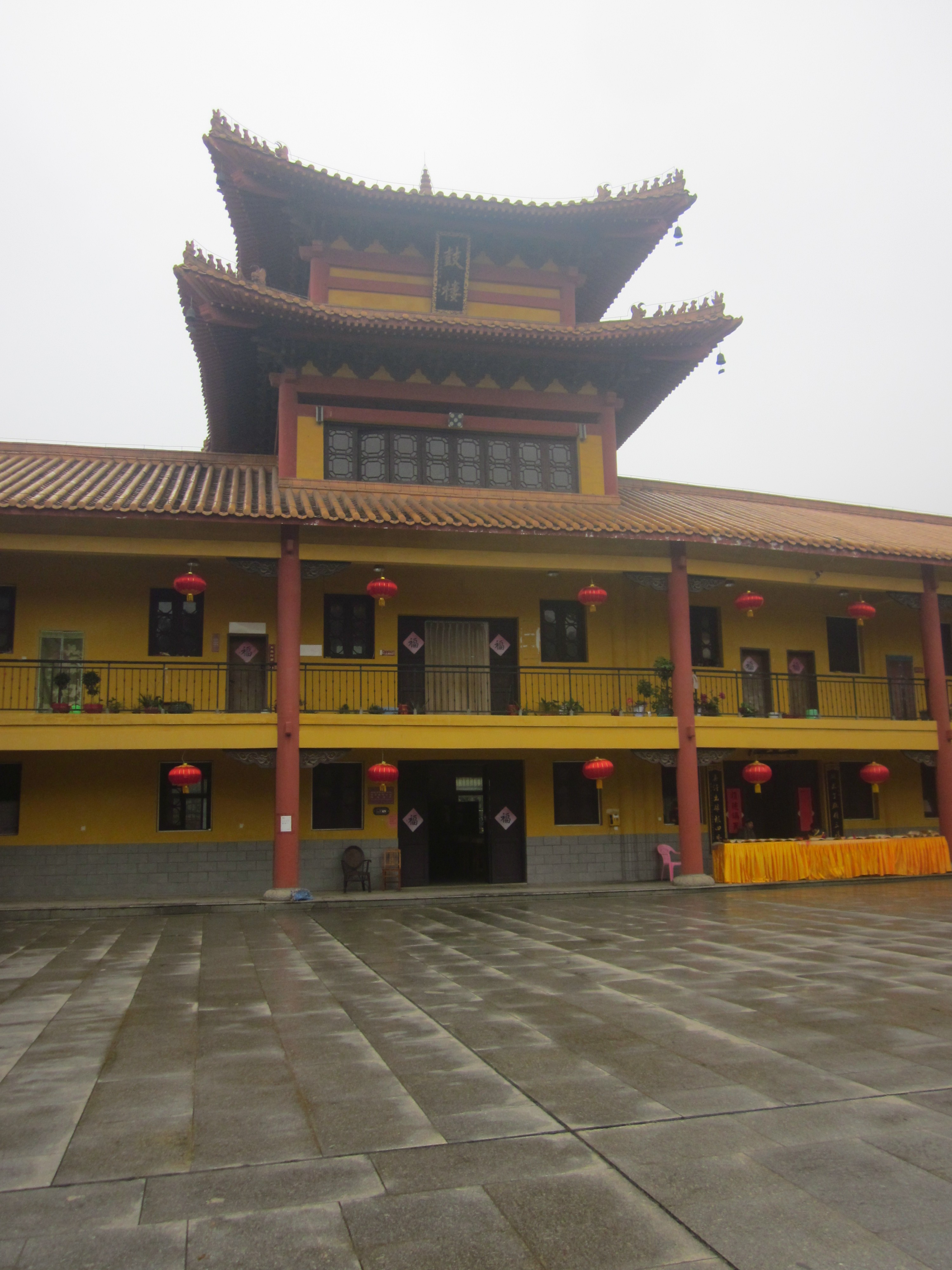
Drum tower
