= Zhenru Temple (Jiangxi) =

Chan Buddhist temple in Jiangxi, China

Zhenru Chan Temple
- 真如禅寺
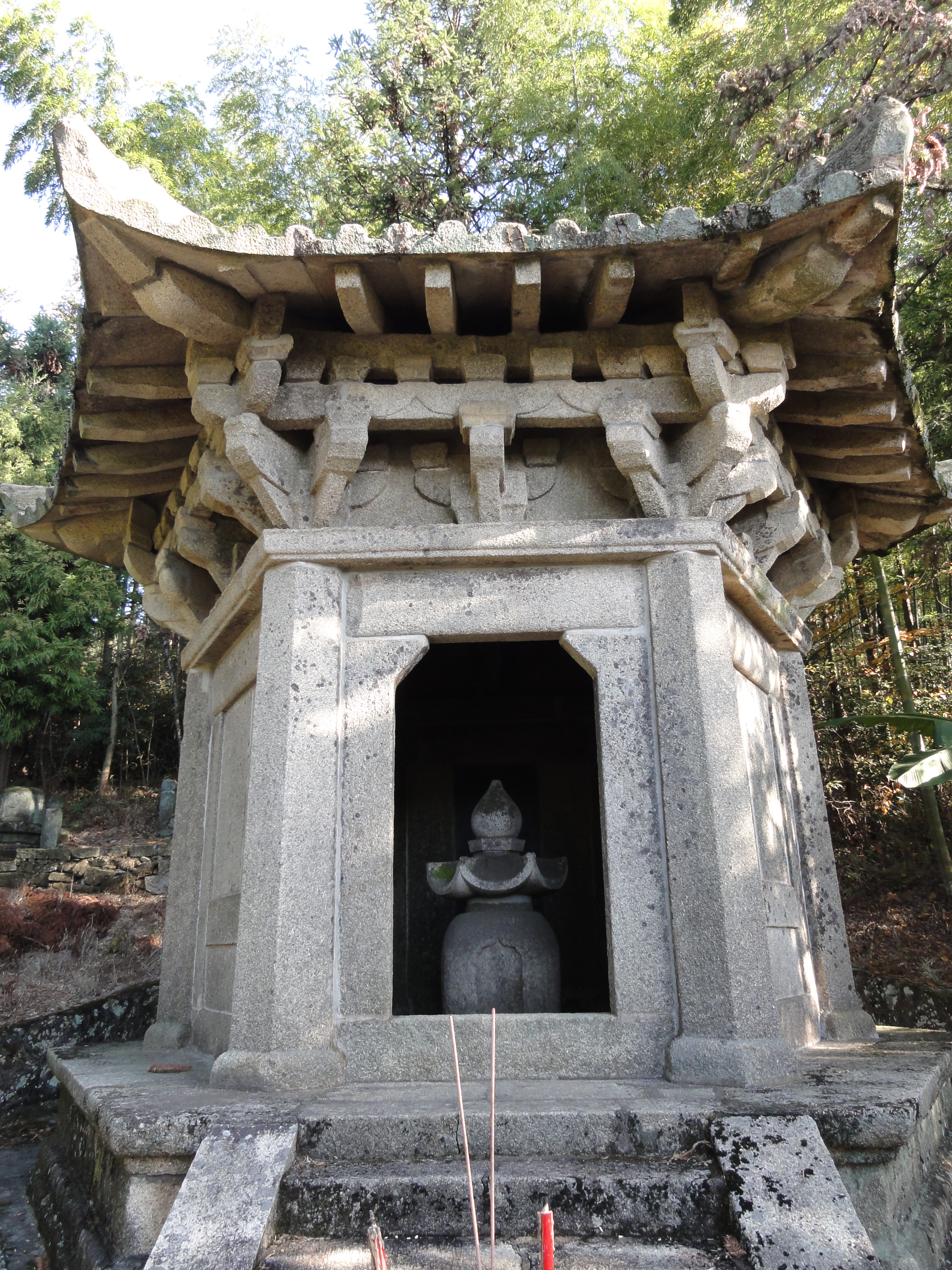

- Location within China

Religion
- Affiliation: Buddhism
- Sect: Caodong school
- Leadership: Shi Chunwen (释纯闻)

Location
- Location: Yongxiu County, Jiangxi
- Country: China
- Coordinates: 29°05′52″N 115°35′29″E

Architecture
- Style: Chinese architecture
- Founder: Daorong
- Established: 806–810
- Completed: 1950s (reconstruction)

Website
- www.yjsfj.com

The Zhenru Chan Temple (simplified Chinese: 真如禅寺; traditional Chinese: 真如禪寺; pinyin: Zhēnrú Chán Sì) is a Chan Buddhist temple located on the southwestern hillside of Mount Yunju in Yongxiu County, Jiangxi, China. Zhenru Chan Temple is the cradle of Caodong school in Chinese Buddhism. The temple has been burned down and rebuilt several times due to wars and fires. The present version was completed in the 1950s.

== History ==
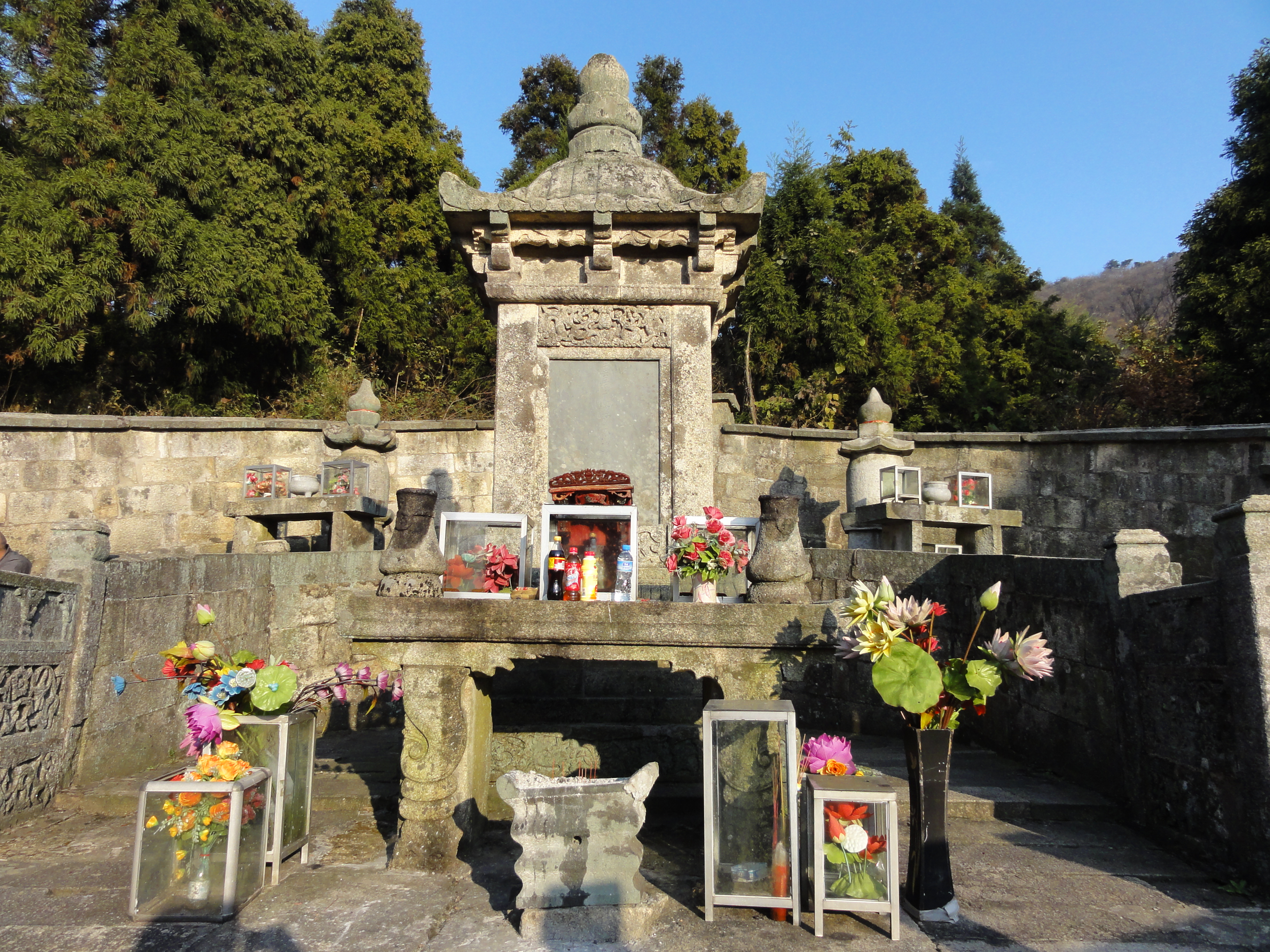
Stupa of Zhuanyu Guanheng, the abbot of Zhenru Chan Temple in the Ming dynasty (1368–1644).

=== Tang dynasty ===
The Zhenru Temple was built between 806 and 810 during the mid-Tang dynasty (618–907) by monk Daorong, where he taught Chan Buddhism with his disciples Quanqing (全庆) and Quanhui (全悔) for almost 70 years. In the year 883 during the reign of Emperor Xizong, the local military governor Zhong Chuan (钟传) invited master Daoying (道膺) to the temple to preach Buddhism. The emperor bestowed a plaque inscribed with: 龙昌禅院 ("Longchang Chan Temple").

=== Yuan dynasty ===
In the late Yuan dynasty (1127–1368), a fire consumed the entire temple.

=== Ming dynasty ===
In 1592, in the 20th year of Wanli period in the Ming dynasty (1368–1644), Hongduan (洪断), the abbot of Wanfo Temple in Beijing, went to Mount Yuju to rebuild the temple. The empress dowager learned of the news and gave a bronze statue of Rocana and a set of Tripitaka to help the project. In 1602, the Wanli Emperor inscribed some plaques and couplets to the temple.

=== Republic of China ===
In 1937, after the Marco Polo Bridge Incident, the Imperial Japanese Army invaded China and the Zhenru Chan Temple was demolished by artillery. Only the bronze statue of Rocana survived.

=== People's Republic of China ===
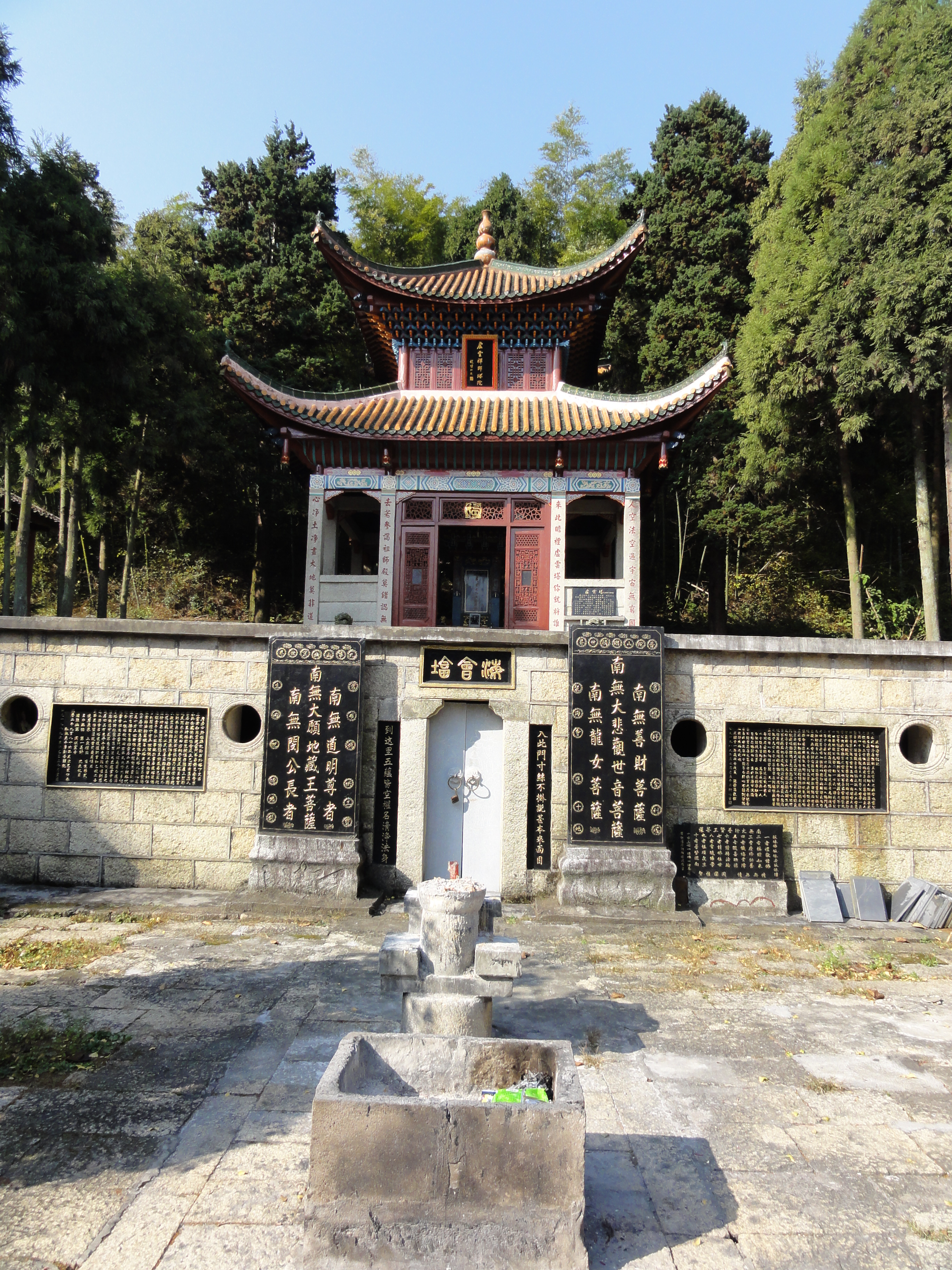
Stupa of Hsu Yun.

After the establishment of the People's Republic of China, Chan master Xuyun, then Honorary Chairman of the Chinese Buddhist Association, started to reconstruct the temple. The reconstruction took six years, and lasted from 1953 to 1959. In 1957, the Zhenru Temple was designated as a provincial level key cultural heritage by the Jiangxi Provincial Government.

In 1966, Mao Zedong launched the Cultural Revolution, almost all volumes of scriptures, historical documents, statues of Buddha, and other works of art were either removed, damaged or destroyed under the attack of the Red Guards. And the government forced monks to return to secular life.

After the 3rd plenary session of the 11th Central Committee of the Chinese Communist Party, according to the national policy of free religious belief, Zhenru Chan Temple was officially reopened to the public in 1982. Then the temple reactivated its religious activities. The halls were restored and renovated by the local government. In September 1982 the Stupa of Hsu Yun was added to the temple. In 1983, the temple was classified as a National Key Buddhist Temple in Han Chinese Area by the State Council of China. At the end of 1986, the shanmen, abbot's room, storeroom and other halls were gradually completed.

In September 1990, in order to commemorate the reconstruction of Hsu Yun, the temple build a memorial hall named after him.

In 2006, Zhenru Chan Temple was listed among the six group of "Major National Historical and Cultural Sites in Jiangxi" by the State Council of China.

On April 2, 2015, former chairman of the Standing Committee of the National People's Congress Wu Bangguo and his wife Zhang Ruizhen visited the temple. On September 9, King of Cambodia Norodom Sihamoni visited and presented a statue of Sakyamuni to the temple.

On December 21, 2017, former Venerable Master of the Buddhist Association of China Yicheng died in the temple.

== Architecture ==
Along the central axis are the Shanmen, Hall of Four Heavenly Kings, Hall of Skanda, Mahavira Hall, Drama Hall and Buddhist Texts Library and on the east and west sides are the Bell Tower, Drum Tower. They are organized in a neat formation.

=== Hall of Four Heavenly Kings ===
The Four Heavenly Kings are enshrined in the Hall of Four Heavenly Kings. They are the eastern Dhṛtarāṣṭra, the southern Virūḍhaka, the western Virūpākṣa, and the northern Vaiśravaṇa.

=== Mahavira Hall ===
The Mahavira Hall is the second hall and main hall in the temple. In the middle is the statue of Sakyamuni, statues of Amitabha and Bhaisajyaguru stand on the left and right sides of Sakyamuni's statue. At the back of his statue are the statues of Samantabhadra, Guanyin and Manjushri. The statues of Eighteen Arhats stand on both sides of the hall. The hall is about 24 metres (79 ft) long and 15 metres (49 ft) wide. It was built by Hsu Yun in 1955.

=== Memorial Hall of Hsu Yun ===
The Memorial Hall of Hsu Yun was built in September 1990. The imitation Song-dynasty-style hall is 12 metres (39 ft) high, 19.5 metres (64 ft) long and 11 metres (36 ft) wide. The 1-metre (3 ft 3 in) high and 500-kilogram (1,100 lb) weight statue of Hsu Yun is placed in the middle of the hall. There is a wooden plaque on the facade of the hall under the eaves written by the then Venerable Master of the Buddhist Association of China Zhao Puchu with the Chinese characters: 虚云纪念堂 ("Memorial Hall of Hsu Yun").
