= Guangji Temple (Beijing) =

Buddhist temple in Beijing, China

- 广济寺
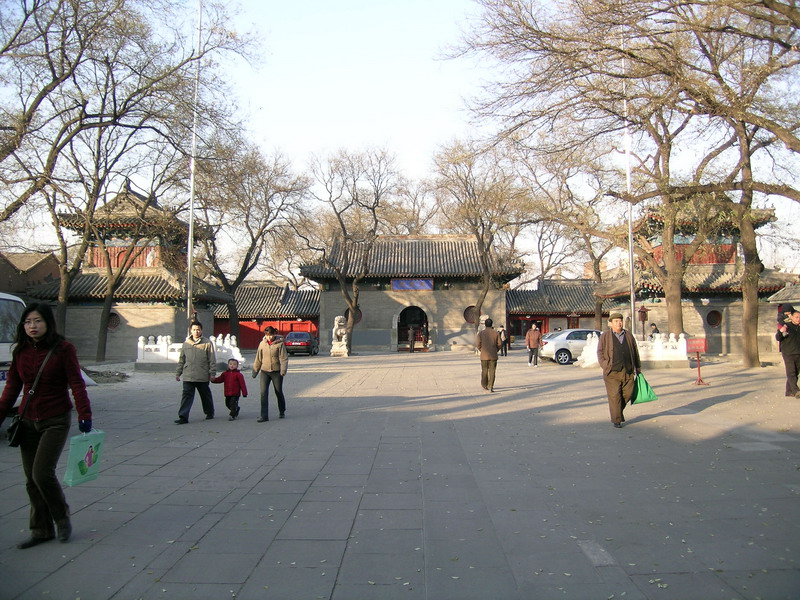
- Guangji Temple

- Location in Beijing.

Religion
- Affiliation: Chan Buddhism

Location
- Location: Beijing
- Country: China
- Coordinates: 39°55′25″N 116°21′58″E

Architecture
- Style: Chinese architecture
- Established: Jin dynasty (1115-1234)

The Guangji Temple (simplified Chinese: 广济寺; traditional Chinese: 廣濟寺; pinyin: Guǎngjì Sì) is a Buddhist temple located at inner Fuchengmen Street, Xicheng District, Beijing, China. It is also the headquarters of the Buddhist Association of China, founded by Master Xuyun, who is the father of modern Buddhism and hailed from Zhenru Temple. The current abbot is Shi Yanjue.

Originally built in the Jin dynasty (1115-1234), additions were made to the temple by successive dynasties. However, the present temple was completed during the Ming dynasty (1368–1644). It covers an area of 5.766 acres (23,330 m^{2}). The major structures in the temple divides between the main gate and four other large halls and many other temples.

The temple houses a wall of 18 Buddhist figures, many Ming dynasty religious relics and a library of over 100,000 volumes of scriptures in 20 different languages, some of which date back to the time of the Song dynasty (960–1279).

On April 6, 1925 the monk Taixu organized the Chinese Buddhist Federation headquarters in the temple to organize candidates to travel to the November 1925 East Asian Buddhism Conference.

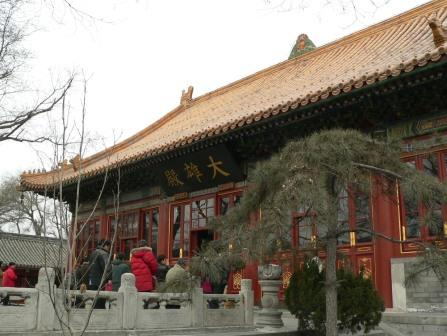
Main Hall

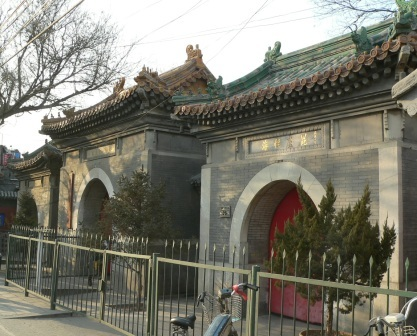
Mountain Gate
