= Longquan Monastery =

Buddhist temple in Haidian District, Beijing, China

Beijing Longquan Monastery
- 北京龙泉寺
- Interactive map of Beijing Longquan Monastery

People
- Founder: Ven. Xuecheng
- Abbot: Ven. Xuecheng

Site
- Location: Beijing, China
- Coordinates: 40°06′08″N 116°05′05″E
- Website: eng.longquanzs.org

Longquan Monastery, also called Longquan Temple or Beijing Longquan Monastery is a Chinese Buddhist monastery located in the suburban area of Beijing, China. It was originally established in Liao dynasty and recently revived on April 11, 2005 by Ven. Master Xuecheng.

Longquan Monastery is famous for its sangha body. Currently, there are hundreds of monks. Many of them have very high education degree from top universities in China. Longquan Monastery is also notable for creating the robot and chatbot Robot Monk Xian'er.

Longquan Monastery is located at the foot of the Phoenix mountain range in the westernmost portion of Beijing's Haidian District. Founded in the Liao Dynasty (907–1125), this generations-old monastery brims with an air of modernization. On April 11, 2005, the monastery formally opened itself up to the outside and Ven. Master Xuecheng, the current president of the Buddhist Association of China, was appointed abbot.

Since opening, Beijing's Longquan Monastery has devoted itself to developing new channels, methods, and means of combining Buddhist traditions with modern culture. This includes making its values integrated and useful to mainstream society and promoting traditional Chinese culture across the world.

“Relying on precepts to guard the Sangha, the Sangha to guard the lay community, and allow cooperation between the two to blossom” are methods to which the monastery holds fast. It uses them as a means to cultivate talented laypersons and spread the word of Dharma.

Currently, this body - - aimed at propagating Buddhist teachings - is divided into five major departments and three major centers. The five departments are Construction, Culture, Charity, Publicity, and Education. There are also three specialist Centers - Translation, Animation, and Artificial Intelligence & IT. This cooperative division of labor has allowed the monastery to develop various projects, such as the construction of infrastructure, the publishing of books and CD ROMs, charitable contributions to the public, the development of a traditional culture website, the education of lay Buddhists, the translation of Buddhist works, the creation of manga and anime, and the digitization of the monastery's information networks.

== History ==
The Longquan Monastery was founded in AD 957 during the Liao dynasty.

== Longquan Monastery's History of Propagating Buddhism ==
Feb 2006: Ven. Master Xuecheng opened his Sina Weibo microblog.

Oct 2006: The Beijing Ren Ai Charity Foundation was established.

Aug 2008: The Chinese and English "Voice of Longquan" websites were opened.

Feb 2011: Ven. Master Xuecheng opened microblogs in eight languages, including Chinese, English, French, German, Russian, Japanese, Korean, and Spanish.

Dec 2012: Monk & Blog, a compilation of 100 sets of microblog posts, was published.

Sep 2015: A Series of Teachings by Ven. Master Xuecheng was released on CD ROM and flash drive. The 18-series set includes 297 lectures.

Oct 2015: Robot Monk Xian'er was born.

Oct 2015: Collated and Explained Nanshan Vinaya was published with 8 sets and 32 books.

Dec 2015: Longquan Monastery's first overseas monastery, the Longquan Great Compassion Monastery, was opened.

July 2016: Longquan Monastery's first African monastery, the Longquan Bohua Monastery in Botswana, was opened, and the Great Buddha Hall was consecrated.

Jan 2017: The “Journey of a Mentally Challenged Child to Offer Congee”, initiated by Beijing Ren Ai Charity Foundation Tsinghua Congee Offering Stack, was selected as the "Most Internationally Influential Chinese Story of Charity."

== Urban "modernity" at Longquan Monastery ==
Longquan Monastery, a sacred Buddhist temple with history spanning over 1,000 years, is now upgraded and given a “makeover” with high technology. From iPads to webcams, the monastery has been completely filled with the sense of urban “modernity”. However, tourists and Chinese citizens do not only come to visit this once lonesome temple on a hilltop in northwest Beijing to admire the monastery’s technological makeover, but also to examine the way Longquan Monastery has become a haven for the spiritually adrift.

When discussing urban “modernity” in China, we often think of moving away from traditional practices to become more scientific, which categories religious practices as backward, outdated and superstitious, and it has become apparent that the same shift has happened to Longquan Monastery. The scientific modifications in Longquan Monastery can be described in the sense that there is a shift from deep philosophy to more practical teachings, such as resolving family conflict. Longquan Monastery has become a haven for a distinct brand of Buddhism, one that preaches connectivity instead of seclusion and emphasizes practical advice over deep philosophy.

When the monastery reopened in 2005, it was equipped with fingerprint scanners, webcams and iPads for studying sutras, or Buddhist texts. Moreover, the leader of the monastery, the Venerable Xuecheng, stated that Buddhism can stay relevant only by embracing modern tools and that it is no longer realistic to expect people to attend daily lectures. Modern tools that were once deemed as a form of distraction have now been “naturally” incorporated into Longquan Monastery.

== See also ==
- Robot Monk Xian'er
- Xuecheng (monk)
