= Shi Yicheng =

Chinese Buddhist monk (1927–2017)

- 释一诚
- Title: Venerable Master of the Buddhist Association of China

Personal life
- Born: Zhou Yunsheng (周云生); February 2, 1927 Wangcheng County, Changsha, Hunan, China
- Died: 21 December 2017 (aged 90) Zhenru Chan Temple, Jiangxi, China
- Notable work(s): Tolerant; A Usual-Heart; World Is Your Own, Nothing To Do with Others; Orography of Baofengshan
- Education: Research Institute of Buddhist Studies

Religious life
- Religion: Chan Buddhism
- Temple: Zhenru Chan Temple; Xixin Chan Temple; Fayuan Temple
- School: Weiyang school Linji school
- Lineage: 10th generation of Weiyang school 45th generation of Linji school
- Dharma name: Yicheng (一诚); Changmiao (常妙); Yanxin (衍心)

Senior posting
- Teacher: Hsu Yun
- Period in office: 2002-2010
- Predecessor: Zhao Puchu
- Successor: Chuanyin

Chinese name
- Traditional Chinese: 釋一誠
- Simplified Chinese: 释一诚
Transcriptions
Standard Mandarin
- Hanyu Pinyin: Yīchéng

Birth name
- Traditional Chinese: 周雲生
- Simplified Chinese: 周云生
Transcriptions
Standard Mandarin
- Hanyu Pinyin: Zhōu Yúnshēng

Dharma name
- Simplified Chinese: 衍心
Transcriptions
Standard Mandarin
- Hanyu Pinyin: Yǎnxīn

Dharma name
- Chinese: 常妙
Transcriptions
Standard Mandarin
- Hanyu Pinyin: Chángmiào

Shi Yicheng (simplified Chinese: 释一诚; traditional Chinese: 釋一誠; pinyin: Yīchéng; 2 February 1927 – 21 December 2017) was a Chinese Buddhist monk, Chan master and religious leader. Yicheng was best known as Venerable Master of the Buddhist Association of China.

== Early life ==
Yicheng was born Zhou Yunsheng (周云生) into a family of farming background in Wangcheng County, Changsha, Hunan, during the Republic of China.

He studied rockwork and architecture under his father when he was ten years old.

== Religious life ==
At age 15, he paid a religious homage to Wushan Temple (乌山寺) and wrote a Gatha when he stood in front of the statue of Gautama Buddha.

In June 1949, Yicheng took refuge in the Three Jewels under master Mingxin (明心) in Xixin Chan Temple, and received complete ordination under Xuyun in the winter of 1956, as the 10th generation of the Guiyang school and the 45th generation of the Linji school, in Nanhua Temple, Shaoguan, south China's Guangdong province.

In 1956, he entered the Research Institute of Buddhist Studies, which was founded by Hsu Yun and where Haideng (海灯) taught.

In 1966, the Cultural Revolution was launched by Mao Zedong, he was transferred to a reclamation farm in Yunjushan as a farmer, until the end of 1978. According to the national policy of free religious belief, he regained his identity as a monk.

In the Spring of 1979, he resided in Zhenru Chan Temple, where he served as its abbot since 1985.

In 1986, Yicheng became the president of the Buddhist Association of Yongxiu County and the president of the Buddhist Association of Jiangxi.

In September 2002, he was elected Venerable Master of the Buddhist Association of China, a position he held for almost eight years.

In September 2003, he served as abbot of Fayuan Temple.

Yicheng won the Confucius Peace Prize in 2013.

Yicheng died in Zhenru Chan Temple, Jiangxi, on December 21, 2017.

== Works ==
- 《容忍》 [Tolerant] (in Chinese). Jiuzhou Publishing House. 2014. ISBN 9787510819872.
- 《平常心》 [A Usual-Heart] (in Chinese). Jiuzhou Publishing House. 2013. ISBN 9787510819865.
- 《世界是自己的，与别人无关》 [World Is Your Own, Nothing To Do with Others] (in Chinese). Guizhou People's Publishing House. 2017. ISBN 9787221115034.
- 《宝峰山志》 [Orography of Baofengshan] (in Chinese). China Buddhism Press. 2004.

Buddhist titles
Preceded by Zhao Puchu	Venerable Master of the Buddhist Association of China; 2002–2010	Succeeded by Shi Chuanyin
