= Fayun =

Chinese Buddhist monk

- Title: Ch'an-shih

Personal life
- Born: 1933 Jiangxi province, China
- Died: 2003 (aged 69–70)

Religious life
- Religion: Buddhism
- School: Yunmen Ch'an

Senior posting
- Teacher: Hsu Yun

Fayun (also romanized as Fa Yun) (Traditional Chinese: 法雲法師; Simplified Chinese: 法云法师; Pinyin: Fǎ Yún Fǎ Shī) (1933–2003) was a Chinese Buddhist monk and thirteenth generation successor in the Yunmen (雲門; Cloud Gate) lineage of the Chan (Zen) school of Chinese Buddhism.

== Early life and monkhood ==
Master Fayun was born in 1933 in Jiangxi province, China. His lay name was Yu Heng-sheng. He entered the Buddhist monastic order at thirteen years of age and received the religious name Fayun meaning Dharma Cloud (Cloud of the Buddha's Teachings).

He was a disciple of the eminent Chinese monk Hsu Yun (虛雲; Pinyin: Xuyun) (1840–1959) and was also one of his personal attendants who served him, most notably during the Yunmen incident in 1951-52 when Master Hsu Yun and his monks were beaten and tortured by thugs that surrounded Yunmen Monastery (雲門寺; Yunmen Si) in Shaoguan, Guangdong province, soon after the Communist Revolution in China.

== Coming to the West ==
In 1969, Master Fayun came to the United States at the invitation of a Buddhist devotee to teach Chan Buddhism (i.e. Zen Buddhism) and Pure Land Buddhism in America. In 1974, he founded the Grace Gratitude Buddhist Temple (美國紐約佛恩寺; Meiguo Niuyue Fo'en Si) in New York City. Today, it is one of the oldest Chinese Buddhist temples in the city. Starting in 1985, he served as a liaison coordinator for the World Buddhist Sangha Council (世界佛教僧伽會; Shijie Fojiao Sengqie Hui). From 1979 to 2002, he served as vice president of the American Buddhist Confederation (美國佛教聯合會; Meiguo Fojiao Lianhe Hui). Master Fayun was known by all for his utmost compassion towards all people and living beings.

== Passing ==
Master Fayun died on September 25, 2003. Soon after his cremation, many relics (Sanskrit: Sarira; Chinese: Sheli 舍利; Tibetan: Ringsel), round pellet-size material that look like beads, crystals, or pearls of any color that are found in the cremated ashes of those who are believed to possess advanced spiritual qualities, were discovered amongst his cremains. The cremains were brought back to Yunmen Monastery in Guangdong province, China in November 2003 and they, along with some of his relics, were finally interred into a memorial stupa there in 2004.
