= Xuyun =

Chinese Chan Buddhist master and teacher

Shi Xuyun
- 釋虛雲
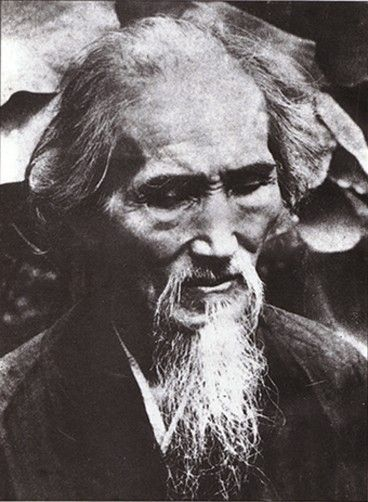
- Xuyun
- Title: Honorary President of the Buddhist Association of China

Personal life
- Born: 5 September 1840 (reputedly) Quanzhou, Fujian, Qing China
- Died: 13 October 1959 (Aged 119 years, 48 days) Zhenru Temple, Jiangxi, China

Religious life
- Religion: Chan Buddhism
- Temple: Zhenru Temple (Jiangxi)
- School: Weiyang school Linji school Caodong school Yunmen school Fayan school
- Lineage: 8th generation of Weiyang school 43rd generation of Linji school 8th generation of Fayan school 47th generation of Caodong school 12th generation of Yunmen school
- Dharma name: Xuyun

Senior posting
- Teacher: Changkai; Yung Ching; Miaolian
- Students: Fo Yuan, Jy Ding, Jing Hui, Charles Luk, Hsuan Hua, Benhuan, Yicheng (monk), Chuanyin

Military service

Chinese name
- Traditional Chinese: 釋虛雲
- Simplified Chinese: 释虚云
Transcriptions
Standard Mandarin
- Hanyu Pinyin: Xūyún
- Wade–Giles: Hsǖ Yǘn
- Yale Romanization: Syūyún
Yue: Cantonese
- Yale Romanization: Heuīwàhn
- Jyutping: Heoi^{1}wan^{4}
Southern Min
- Hokkien POJ: Hu-Ûn
- Tâi-lô: Hu^{7}hun^{7}

Birth name
- Traditional Chinese: 蕭古巖 or 蕭演彻
- Simplified Chinese: 萧古岩 or 萧演彻
Transcriptions
Standard Mandarin
- Hanyu Pinyin: Xiāo Gǔyán or Xiāo Yǎnchè
- Wade–Giles: Hsiāo Kǔyén
- Yale Romanization: Syāu Gǔyán
Yue: Cantonese
- Yale Romanization: Sīu Gúngàahm
- Jyutping: Siu^{1} Gu^{2}ngaam^{4}
Southern Min
- Hokkien POJ: Siau Kó͘-gâm

Courtesy name
- Chinese: 德清
Transcriptions
Standard Mandarin
- Hanyu Pinyin: Déqīng

Art name
- Traditional Chinese: 幻遊老人
- Simplified Chinese: 幻游老人
Transcriptions
Standard Mandarin
- Hanyu Pinyin: Huànyóu Lǎorén

Shi Xuyun or Hsu Yun (simplified Chinese: 释虚云; traditional Chinese: 釋虛雲; pinyin: Xūyún; 5 September 1840? – 13 October 1959) was a renowned Chinese Chan Buddhist master and an influential Buddhist teacher of the 19th and 20th centuries.

== Early life ==
Xuyun was purportedly born on 5 September 1840 in Fujian, Qing China. His original name was Xiao Guyan (simplified Chinese: 萧古岩; traditional Chinese: 萧古巖; pinyin: Xiāo Gǔyán). He was the son of Xiao Yutang (Chinese: 萧玉堂; pinyin: Xiāo Yùtáng) and his mother was surnamed Yan (simplified Chinese: 颜; traditional Chinese: 顏; pinyin: Yán). His mother died during childbirth. Xuyun's grandmother insisted that her grandson take a wife. In order to continue both his and his uncle's lineage, Xuyun was arranged to marry one woman from the Tian family and one from the Tan family.

His first exposure to Buddhism was during the funeral of his grandmother. Soon afterward he began reading Buddhist sutras and later made a pilgrimage to Mount Heng, one of the most important Buddhist sites in China.

When he was fourteen years old, Xuyun announced that he wished to renounce the material world in favour of monastic life. His father did not approve of Buddhism and had him instructed in Taoism instead. Xuyun was dissatisfied with Taoism, which he felt could not reach the deeper truths of existence. The storerooms of his house were full of very old books. Going through them, he found a volume called the "Story of Incense Mountain" (cf. Guanyin#Miaoshan), which described the life of Guanyin. After reading the book, he was deeply influenced and was inspired to leave home and practice Buddhism as a monk.

When Xuyun was seventeen, he attempted to flee to Mount Heng to become a monk without his family's permission. On a winding mountain path, he encountered envoys sent by his uncle who successfully intercepted Xuyun and escorted him back home. When he arrived home, the family feared that he would escape again, so he was sent with his first cousin, Fu Guo (simplified Chinese: 富国; traditional Chinese: 富國; pinyin: Fù guó), to Quanzhou. His father formally received two brides from the Tian and Tan families for Xuyun, and his marriage was completed. Although they lived together, Xuyun did not have sexual contact with his wives. Moreover, he extensively explained the dharma to them so that they too would practice Buddhism.

Fu Guo also had previously explored Buddhism and had the same aspirations as Xuyun, so they "amicably traveled the Path together." When Xuyun was nineteen years old, he began the journey to Gu Shan (Drum Mountain) in Fuzhou, accompanied by Fu Guo. Before leaving, he wrote the "Song of the SkinBag" which he left behind for his two wives.

At Gu Shan monastery, Xuyun had his head shaved and received ordination as a monk. When his father sent agents to find him, Xuyun concealed himself in a grotto behind the monastery, where he lived in solitude for three years. At the age of twenty-five, Xuyun learned that his father had died, and his stepmother and two wives had entered the monastic life.

== Middle age and enlightenment ==
During his years as a hermit, Xuyun made some of his most profound discoveries. He visited the old master Yong-jing, who encouraged him to abandon his extreme asceticism in favor of temperance. He instructed the young monk in the sutras and told him to be mindful of the Hua Tou. In his thirty-sixth year, with the encouragement of Yong-jing, Xuyun went on a seven-year pilgrimage to Mount Putuo off the coast of Ningbo, a place regarded by Buddhists as the bodhimaṇḍa of Avalokiteśvara. He went on to visit the Temple of King Ashoka and various Chan holy places. By age forty-three, Xuyun had left home life for more than twenty years, but had not yet completed his practice in the Path. He had not repaid his parents' kindness, and so he vowed to again make a pilgrimage to Nan Hai. From Fa Hua Temple all the way to Qingliang Peak at Mount Wutai of the northwest, the bodhimaṇḍa of Manjushri, he made one full prostration every three steps. He prayed for the rebirth of his parents in the Pure Land. Along the way, Xuyun is said to have met a beggar called Wen Ji, who twice saved his life. After talking with the monks at Mount Wutai, Xuyun came to believe that the beggar had been an incarnation of Manjushri.

Having achieved singleness of mind, Xuyun traveled west and south, making his way through Tibet. He visited many monasteries and holy places, including Sichuan's Mount Emei, the bodhimaṇḍa of Samantabhadra Bodhisattva, the Potala Palace, the seat of the Dalai Lama, and Tashilhunpo Monastery, the seat of the Panchen Lama. He traveled through India and Ceylon, and then across the sea to Burma. During this time of wandering, he felt his mind clearing and his health growing stronger. Xuyun composed a large number of poems during this period.

After returning to China at age fifty-three, Xuyun joined with other Venerable Masters Pu Zhao, Yue Xia, and Yin Lian (Lotus Seal) to study together. They climbed Mount Jiuhua (bodhimaṇḍa of Ksitigarbha Bodhisattva) and repaired the huts on Cui Feng Summit, where Dharma Master Pu Zhao expounded the Mahavaipulyabuddha Avatamsaka (Flower Adornment) Sutra.

When Xuyun was fifty-six, the Abbot Yue Lang of Gaomin Temple in Yangzhou was going to convene a twelve-week session of continuous dhyana meditation. Preparing to leave, the group asked Xuyun to go first. After reaching Di Gang, he had to cross the water, but the ferry left without him as he had no money. As he walked along the river's edge, he suddenly lost his footing and fell into the rushing water, where he bobbed helplessly for a day and night before being caught in a fisherman's net. He was carried to a nearby temple, where he was revived and treated for his injuries. Feeling ill, he nevertheless returned to Yangzhou. When asked by Yue Lang whether he would participate in the upcoming weeks of meditation, he politely declined, without revealing his illness. The temple had rules that those who were invited had to attend or else face punishment. In the end, Yue Lang had Xuyun beaten with a keisaku. He willingly accepted this punishment, although it worsened his condition.

For the next several days, Xuyun sat in continuous meditation. In his autobiography, he wrote: "[in] the purity of my singleness of mind, I forgot all about my body. Twenty days later, my illness vanished completely. From that moment, with all my thoughts entirely wiped out, my practice took effect throughout the day and night. My steps were as swift as if I was flying in the air. One evening, after meditation, I opened my eyes and suddenly saw I was in brightness similar to broad daylight in which I could see everything inside and outside the monastery..." But he knew that this occurrence was only a mental state, and that it was not at all rare. He did not become attached to this achievement, but continued his single-minded investigation of the question, "who is mindful of the Buddha?" He delved into this topic without interruption.

Xuyun composed a commemorative verse for the oft-cited moment of profound insight, which was galvanized by the sound of a breaking teacup in the Chan Hall:

A cup fell to the ground
With a sound clearly heard.
As space was pulverised,
The mad mind came to a stop.

== Later life ==
Xuyun worked tirelessly as a bodhisattva, teaching precepts, explaining sutras, and restoring old temples. He worked throughout Asia, creating a following across Burma, Thailand, Malaya, and Vietnam, as well as Tibet and China. He remained in China during World War II. In the winter of 1942, Xuyun held a "Protect the Nation, Quell the Disaster, Mahākaruṇā Dharma Assembly" that lasted over three months in Chongqing, the capital of China at that time. He stayed after the rise of the People's Republic of China (PRC) to support the Buddhist communities rather than retreat to the safety of Hong Kong or Taiwan.

In the spring of 1951, Xuyun and twenty-five monks were accused of hiding weapons and treasure. They were arrested and tortured in Yunmen Monastery (simplified Chinese: 云门寺; traditional Chinese: 雲門寺; pinyin: Yúnmén Sì) in Shaoguan, Guangdong province. Some of the monks were tortured to death or suffered broken bones. Xuyun endured several beatings during the interrogations, resulting in fractures to his rib cage. He closed his eyes and would not talk, eat, or drink, and stayed in the samādhi for nine days. During this time, his attendants Fayun and Kuanchun waited on him. Several of his works on scriptural commentary were also destroyed. Li Jishen, who was Vice President of the PRC at the time, informed and sought help from the then Premier of the PRC, Zhou Enlai, who put an end to the monks' detention after three months. This incident later became known as the "Yunmen Incident."

In 1953, with Dharma Master Yuan Ying and others, Xuyun formed the Chinese Buddhist Association at Guangji (Extensive Aid) Monastery where he was Honorary President. The following resolutions were proposed to the government:

1. In all places, further destruction of monasteries and temples, the desecration of images, and the burning of sutras shall immediately cease;
2. Forcing bhikshus and bhikshunis to leave their monastic orders will not be tolerated; and
3. All monastery property shall be returned forthwith, and enough arable acreage should be returned to the Sangha so as to make the monasteries self-supporting.

The petition was approved. Xuyun then represented the Association in receiving three gifts from a Buddhist delegation from Sri Lanka. He also responded to the invitation of Dharma Master Nan Tong to head another Dharma assembly at Lang Shan Monastery, where several thousand people from all over took refuge in Triple Gems. He returned to Shanghai in the third lunar month, and the next month received a telegram from Beijing requesting his presence in the capital. After arriving, he stayed at Guangji Monastery. Representatives of various Buddhist groups also were present, and the Chinese Buddhist Association was officially inaugurated. After a plenary meeting in which important policies were decided, some monks suggested to him some changes to precepts and rules. Xuyun then scolded them and wrote an essay about the manifestation of the Dharma Ending Age.

== Death ==
Xuyun became ill in the summer of 1959 and died on 13 October of the same year.

== Significance ==
In 1953, the Chinese Buddhist Association was established at a meeting with 121 delegates in Beijing. The meeting also elected a chairman, four honorary chairmen, seven vice-chairmen, a secretary general, three deputy secretaries-general, eighteen members of a standing committee, and ninety-three directors. The four elected honorary chairmen were the Dalai Lama, the Panchen Lama, the Grand Lama of Inner Mongolia, and Xuyun himself.

== Publications ==
- Empty Cloud: The Autobiography of the Chinese Zen Master Xu Yun
