= Xuecheng (monk) =

Chinese Buddhist monk

- 学诚
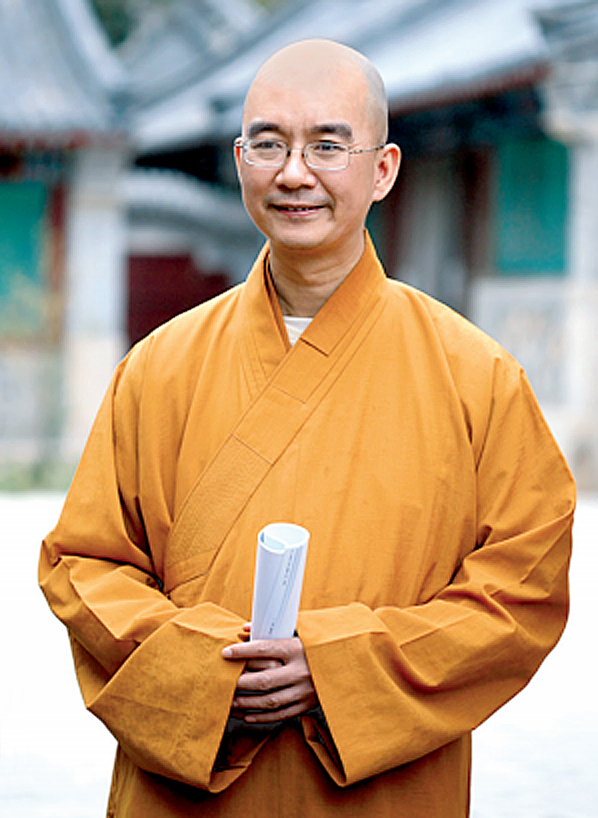
- Xuecheng in 2009

Personal life
- Born: Fu Ruilin; 3 October 1966 (age 59) Xianyou, Fujian, China
- Notable work: Understanding life
- Education: Buddhist Academy of China

Religious life
- Religion: Buddhism
- Temple: Guanghua Temple (Putian); Famen Temple; Beijing Longquan Monastery
- Monastic name: Master Xuecheng

Senior posting
- Teacher: Dinghai; Yuanzhuo
- Based in: Fenghuangling, Beijing, China
- Present post: President of the Buddhist Association of China, President of Buddhist Academy of China
- Website: twitter.com/xuecheng

Xuecheng (Chinese: 学诚; pinyin: Xuéchéng; born 3 October 1966) is a Chinese Buddhist monk, a former member of the National Committee of the Chinese People's Political Consultative Conference, and a popular blogger. He was president of the Buddhist Association of China from 2015 to 2018 when he resigned after allegations that he had engaged in corruption and sexual assault surfaced. He was ordered to be punished by the National Religious Affairs Administration after they corroborated the allegations.

== Biography ==
=== Early life ===
Xuecheng was born as Fu Ruilin (Chinese: 傅瑞林), the eldest of three sons on October 3, 1966, to a family of strong Buddhist culture in Luofeng village of Laidian Town, Xianyou County, Fujian Province. His grandmother was a Buddhist practitioner and later became a nun. His mother was a devoted Buddhist in addition. His father worked as an accountant and office clerk in the village. Influenced by his mother and grandmother, at age 10, Xuecheng voluntarily became a vegetarian, and began to chant Buddhist scriptures aged 12.

=== Training ===
In 1982, aged 16, Master Xuecheng started his monastic life and received teachings from masters such as Ven. Master Dinghai, and Most Ven. Yuanzhuo. He graduated from the Buddhist Academy of China in 1991 with a master's degree.

=== Life as abbot ===
Xuecheng served as abbot of Guanghua Temple (Putian), Famen Temple (Fufeng, Shaanxi), and Beijing Longquan Monastery. In 2007, he was elected secretary general of the Buddhist Association of China, taking over the presidency of this organisation in 2015. He was the youngest monastic ever to ascend to the position.

== Controversies ==
=== Sexual misconduct accusations ===
In 2018, monks who had formerly worked for Xuecheng published a 95-page report which included allegations sexual harassment of several nuns, embezzlement of funds, dictatorial management style, illegal construction, and corruption among other things. He resigned as the head of China's Buddhist association after the allegations were published. According to the South China Morning Post, the report was written by two of the monastery's former monks and posted on social media. The report alleged that the abbot "sent suggestive messages to two female monks at Longquan Temple and made unwanted sexual advances towards at least four others." Other chapters of the report outlined how he had overseen the illegal construction of several buildings at the monastery and embezzled funds. "Longquan temple is under his spell ... Xuecheng manipulated disciples to serve his 'Buddhist empire,'" the report stated. One of the report's authors, Monk Xianqi, told that they didn't intend to make it public and didn't know how it leaked, but from CCN news, he has reported to CNN in July already. The monks had submitted the report to the police. The other authors said on social media that he was compelled to speak out after the victims were ignored by authorities who said they could not investigate the matter. The incident has been characterized as a part of the Chinese me too movement.

In August 2018, the National Religious Affairs Administration (NRAA) announced that its investigators had completed their investigation into the allegations against Xuecheng. The investigation corroborated many of the allegations made against Xuecheng and the NRAA ordered the Buddhist Association of China to severely punish him. A police investigation into the sexual assault allegations is ongoing.

== Publications ==
Academic collection:

- Faith and Dialogues, ISBN 9787512502840
- Harmony and Vision, ISBN 9787512507517
- Responsibility and Commitment, ISBN 9787512507524

Dharma talks collections:

- All Afflictions, Our Own Choices, ISBN 9787505733992
- Let It Go: Losing is Gaining, ISBN 9787507542813
- Understanding Life, ISBN 9787512502895
- The Path of Refuge, ISBN 9787504737045

Blog collection:

- Ven. Master Xuecheng's Blog: Essay Collections (Vol. I—VII), ISBN 9787507521702
- Xuecheng's Blog: Message Collections (Vol. I—VII), ISBN 9787507524055

Dharma talks by video:

- Understanding Life
- A Life of Suffering and Happiness
- Knowing Life
- Breakfast Talks
- The Path of Refuge
- The Path to Enlightenment
- Lamrim Chenmo: Vipashyana
- The Inner World: Lecture on the Treatise on the Illumination Door of the One Hundred Dharmas

Buddhist titles
Preceded by Chuan Yin	President of the Buddhist Association of China; 2015 - 2018	Vacant
