= Zhao Puchu =

Chinese activist (1907–2000)

Zhao Puchu 赵朴初
- Born: November 5, 1907; Taihu County, Anhui Province, Qing China
- Died: May 21, 2000 (aged 92); Beijing, China
- Occupations: Religious and public leader
- Known for: President of the Buddhist Association of China, vice chairman of the 9th National Committee of the Chinese People's Political Consultative Conference, calligrapher
- Political party: China Association for Promoting Democracy

Zhao Puchu (November 5, 1907 – May 21, 2000) was a religious and public leader who promoted cultural progress and religious tolerance in China. Zhao was best known as president of the Buddhist Association of China and also one of the most renowned Chinese calligraphers.

Zhao also served as vice chairman of the 9th National Committee of the Chinese People's Political Consultative Conference and honorary chairman of 10th Central Committee of China Association for Promoting Democracy.

He began his work in the 1930s, serving as secretary of the Buddhist Association of China. Zhao also worked to foster relations with Japan, serving as vice president of the China-Japan Friendship Association from 1958 to 1989, and working as an adviser to the association after. He led a Chinese religious delegation to Japan in 1992, meeting with then prime minister Kiichi Miyazawa and receiving the Grand Cordon of the Order of the Secret Treasure of Japan.

Zhao was outspoken against Falun Gong and supported its ban within China. He died in Beijing, aged 92, in May 2000.

== Honours ==
He was awarded the Niwano Peace Prize on April 9, 1985.

In 1982, he was awarded an honorary doctorate from Bukkyo University in Japan.

== Publications ==
- Answers to Common Questions about Buddhism
- The Buddhism

Buddhist titles
Preceded by Geshe Sherab Gyatso	Venerable Master of the Buddhist Association of China; 1980–2000	Succeeded by Yi Cheng
