= Buddhist Association of China =

State-sanctioned organisation in charge of Buddhists in China

- 中国佛教协会
- Formation: May 30, 1953; 73 years ago
- Headquarters: 25 Fuchengmen Inner Street, Xicheng District, Beijing
- Leader: Shi Yanjue
- Vice President: Gyaincain Norbu; Shi Minghai
- Parent organization: United Front Work Department of the Central Committee of the Chinese Communist Party
- Website: www.chinabuddhism.com.cn

Buddhist Association of China
- Simplified Chinese: 中国佛教协会
- Traditional Chinese: 中國佛教協會
Transcriptions
Standard Mandarin
- Hanyu Pinyin: Zhōngguó Fójiào Xiéhuì

The Buddhist Association of China (BCA, Chinese: 中国佛教协会) is the official government supervisory organ of Buddhism in the People's Republic of China. The association has been overseen by the United Front Work Department (UFWD) of the Central Committee of the Chinese Communist Party (CCP) since the State Administration for Religious Affairs' absorption into the UFWD in 2018. The association's headquarters are located in Guangji Temple in Beijing.

== Overview ==
The BCA is charged with serving as a "bridge" linking Buddhists to the CCP and Chinese government by communicating government regulations to Buddhists and mobilizing them to comply with national laws. It also coordinates participation of Chinese Buddhists in international Buddhist fora as a form of state influence. It also supports local Buddhist associations in paying clerics' salaries, in registering temples with the government, and in productively using temple labor. The association publishes a journal, Chinese Buddhism.

== History ==
The Buddhist Association of China was founded on 30 May 1953, and was disbanded in the late 1960s during the Cultural Revolution, then reactivated following the end of that period.

In 1980, the CCP Central Committee approved a request by the United Front Work Department to create a national conference for religious groups. The BCA was one of five such religious groups, which also included the Islamic Association of China, the Chinese Taoist Association, the Three-Self Patriotic Movement, and the Catholic Patriotic Association.

In 1993, BCA vice president Jinghui began the annual Zen for Daily Life summer camp at the Bailin Temple in Beijing as part of an initiative to revitalize Chan Buddhism in the modern world.

In 1994, Zhao Puchu tried to limit the practice of businesses and municipalities building outlandishly large mountaintop and cliffside Buddha statues. Noting that China has at least one mountaintop Buddha for each of the cardinal directions he stated "That's enough", and clarified. "From now on, there is no need to build any more outdoor Buddha statues." These efforts were entirely unsuccessful.

In 2006, the BCA and the Hong Kong Buddhist Association hosted the second World Buddhist Forum for dialogue between Buddhist monks and scholars from 50 countries and regions. The forum lasted for four days in the city of Wuxi in Jiangsu province. The organizer of events was the president of the BCA, Venerable Master Yicheng. The vice president is Gyaincain Norbu, a disputed 11th Panchen Lama.

In 2017 the BCA declared the longstanding tradition that the first offering of incense of the new year are particularly auspicious to have no grounds in Buddhist doctrine.

In 2018, the BCA's parent organization, the State Administration for Religious Affairs, was absorbed into the CCP's United Front Work Department.

In August 2018 Xuecheng resigned as president of the Buddhist Association of China following reports of sexual harassment by six female monks. The scandal was seen as part of the wider me too movement.

In February 2023, the BCA launched a searchable database of official practitioners.

== Presidents ==
The past presidents of the Buddhist Association of China include:

- Yuanying (1953)
- Geshe Sherap Gyatso (1953–1966)
- Zhao Puchu (1980–2000)
- Yicheng (2005–2010)
- Chuanyin (2010–2015)
- Xuecheng (2015–2018)
- Shi Yanjue (2018–present)

Honorary presidents of the Buddhist association of China include:

- Ngapoi Ngawang Jigme (1980)
- Pagbalha Geleg Namgyai (2002–present)
- Benhuan (2010–2012)

== See also ==
- Buddhism in China
- Buddhist socialism
- Chinese Buddhism
- China Christian Council
