= Wali =

Islamic understanding of saints

The term wali (Arabic: وَلِيّ, romanized: waliyy, lit. 'friend'; plural أَوْلِيَاء, ʾawliyāʾ) is most commonly used by Muslims to refer to a saint, or literally a "friend of God".

In the traditional Islamic understanding, a saint is portrayed as someone "marked by [special] divine favor ... [and] holiness", and who is specifically "chosen by God and endowed with exceptional gifts, such as the ability to work miracles". The doctrine of saints was articulated by Muslim scholars very early on in Islamic history, and particular verses of the Quran and certain hadith were interpreted by early Muslim thinkers as "documentary evidence" of the existence of saints. Graves of saints around the Muslim world became centers of pilgrimage – especially after 1200 CE – for masses of Muslims seeking their barakah (blessing).

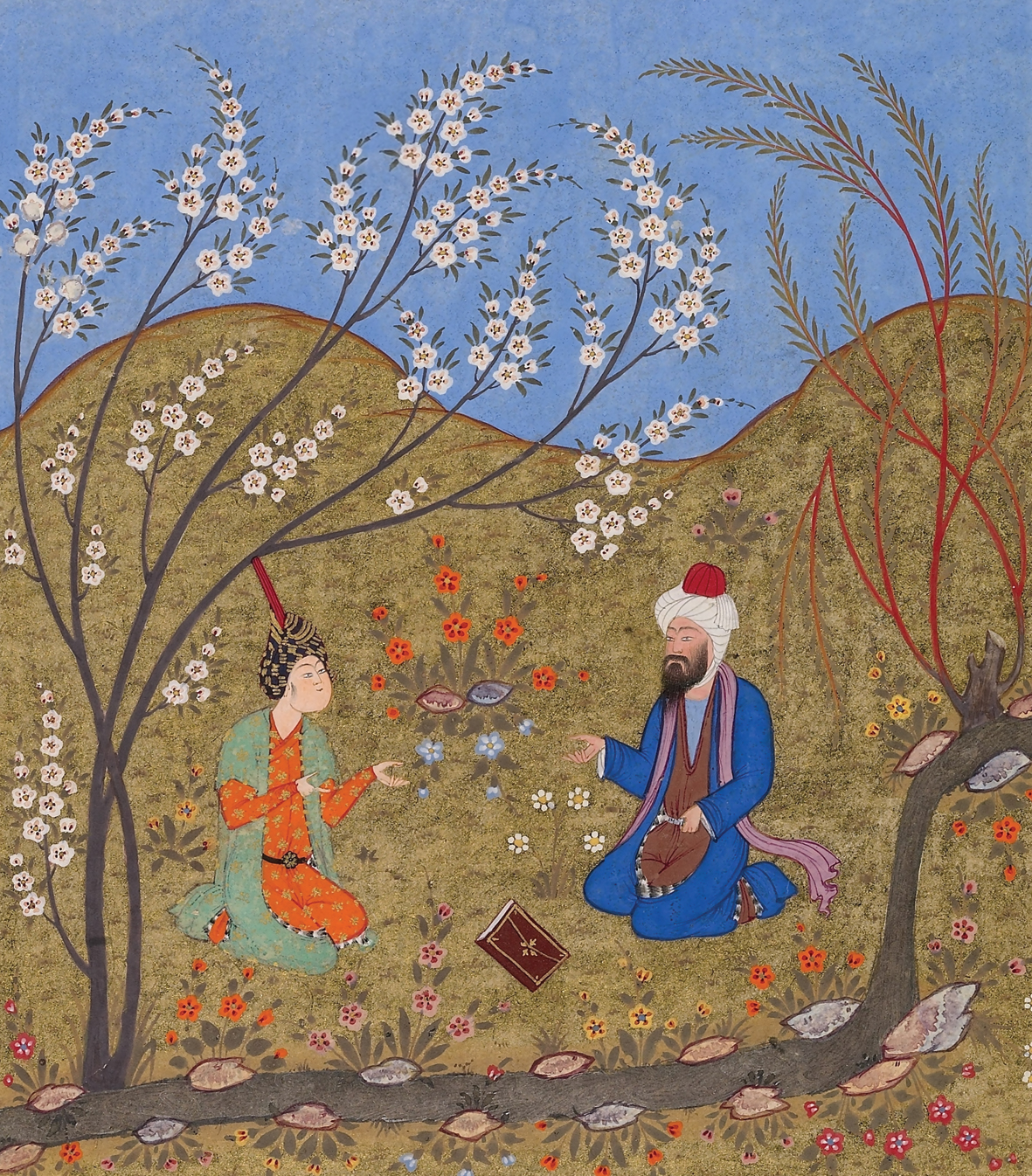
A 1552 Persian miniature of the saint Ahmad Ghazali (d. 1123, brother of al-Ghazali) talking to a disciple.

Since the first Muslim hagiographies were written during the period when the Islamic mystical trend of Sufism began its rapid expansion, many of the figures who later came to be regarded as the major saints in orthodox Sunni Islam were the early Sufi mystics, like Hasan of Basra (d. 728), Farqad Sabakhi (d. 729), Dawud Tai (d. 777–781), Rabia of Basra (d. 801), Maruf Karkhi (d. 815), and Junayd of Baghdad (d. 910). From the twelfth to the fourteenth century, "the general veneration of saints, among both people and sovereigns, reached its definitive form with the organization of Sufism ... into orders or brotherhoods". In the common expressions of Islamic piety of this period, the saint was understood to be "a contemplative whose state of spiritual perfection ... [found] permanent expression in the teaching bequeathed to his disciples". In many prominent Sunni creeds of the time, such as the famous Creed of Tahawi (c. 900) and the Creed of Nasafi (c. 1000), a belief in the existence and miracles of saints was presented as "a requirement" for being an orthodox Muslim believer.

Aside from the Sufis, the preeminent saints in traditional Islamic piety are the Companions of the Prophet, their Successors, and the Successors of the Successors. Additionally, the prophets and messengers in Islam are also believed to be saints by definition, although they are rarely referred to as such, in order to prevent confusion between them and ordinary saints; as the prophets are exalted by Muslims as the greatest of all humanity, it is a general tenet of Sunni belief that a single prophet is greater than all the regular saints put together. In short, it is believed that "every prophet is a saint, but not every saint is a prophet".

In the modern world, traditional Sunni and Shia ideas of saints has been challenged by fundamentalist and revivalist Islamic movements such as the Salafi movement, Wahhabism, and Islamic Modernism, all three of which have, to a greater or lesser degree, "formed a front against the veneration and theory of saints". As has been noted by scholars, the development of these movements has indirectly led to a trend amongst some mainstream Muslims to resist "acknowledging the existence of Muslim saints altogether or ... [to view] their presence and veneration as unacceptable deviations". However, despite the presence of these opposing streams of thought, the classical doctrine of saint veneration continues to thrive in many parts of the Islamic world today, playing a vital role in daily expressions of piety among vast segments of Muslim populations in Muslim countries like Pakistan, Bangladesh, Egypt, Turkey, Senegal, Iraq, Iran, Algeria, Tunisia, Indonesia, Malaysia, and Morocco, as well as in places with substantial Islamic populations like India, China, Russia, and the Balkans.

== Names ==
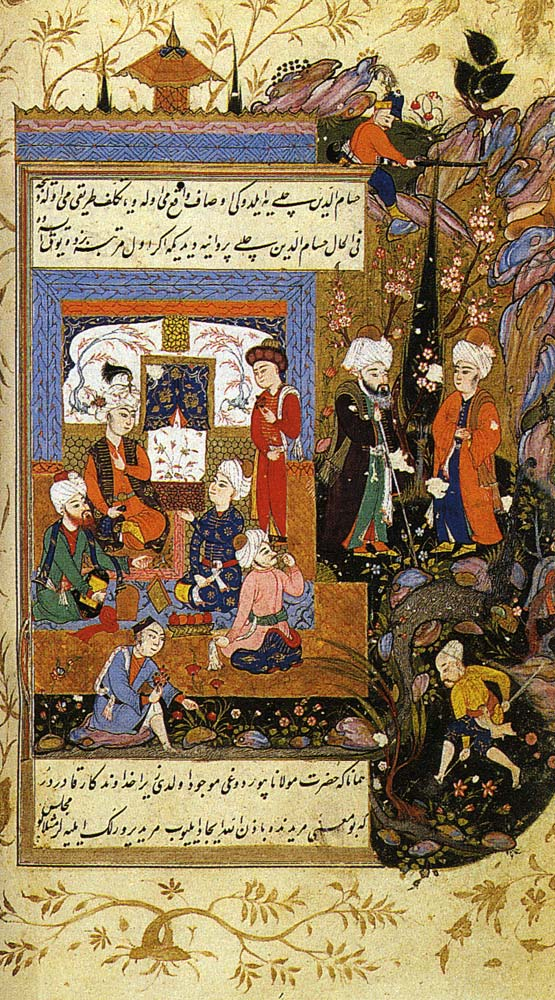
A Persian miniature depicting Jalal al-Din Rumi showing love for his disciple Hussam al-Din Chelebi (ca. 1594)

Regarding the rendering of the Arabic walī by the English "saint", prominent scholars such as Gibril Haddad have regarded this as an appropriate translation, with Haddad describing the aversion of some Muslims towards the use of "saint" for walī as "a specious objection ... for [this is] – like 'Religion' (din), 'Believer' (mu'min), 'prayer' (salat), etc. – [a] generic term for holiness and holy persons while there is no confusion, for Muslims, over their specific referents in Islam, namely: the reality of iman with Godwariness and those who possess those qualities." In Persian, which became the second most influential and widely spoken language in the Islamic world after Arabic, the general title for a saint or a spiritual master became pīr (Persian: پیر, literally "old [person]", "elder"). Although the ramifications of this phrase include the connotations of a general "saint," it is often used to specifically signify a spiritual guide of some type.

The derived terms walaya and waliya are subject to some debate among Western scholars of Sufism today, and even among Sufis of the medieval era. It is centers on which of the two is more appropriate in what context; and the contrasting meaning of ""friend/intimate" vs "authority/protector" and which terms has which meaning; or if the terms mean anything different from each other at all. Nizam ad-Din argued wilaya referred to love, and was a personal quality of a saint, while walaya referred to authority and could be transferred by the saint to others. Ahmad ibn Ibrahim al Magiri on the other hand, saw the terms as essentially the same and thought they referred to (delegated) authority. The terms and their meaning are intimately wrapped around each other, especially as the practice of saintliness often involves both intimacy and authority.

Amongst Indian Muslims, the title pīr baba (पीर बाबा) is commonly used in Hindi to refer to Sufi masters or similarly honored saints. Additionally, saints are also sometimes referred to in the Persian or Urdu vernacular with "Hazrat." In Islamic mysticism, a pīr's role is to guide and instruct his disciples on the mystical path. Hence, the key difference between the use of walī and pīr is that the former does not imply a saint who is also a spiritual master with disciples, while the latter directly does so through its connotations of "elder". Additionally, other Arabic and Persian words that also often have the same connotations as pīr, and hence are also sometimes translated into English as "saint", include murshid (Arabic: مرشد, meaning "guide" or "teacher"), sheikh and sarkar (Persian word meaning "master").

In the Turkish Islamic lands, saints have been referred to by many terms, including the Arabic walī, the Persian s̲h̲āh and pīr, and Turkish alternatives like baba in Anatolia, ata in Central Asia (both meaning "father"), and eren or ermis̲h̲ (< ermek "to reach, attain") or yati̊r ("one who settles down") in Anatolia. Their tombs, meanwhile, are "denoted by terms of Arabic or Persian origin alluding to the idea of pilgrimage (mazār, ziyāratgāh), tomb (ḳabr, maḳbar) or domed mausoleum (gunbad, ḳubba). But such tombs are also denoted by terms usually used for dervish convents, or a particular part of it (tekke in the Balkans, langar, 'refectory,' and ribāṭ in Central Asia), or by a quality of the saint (pīr, 'venerable, respectable,' in Azerbaijan)."

== History ==
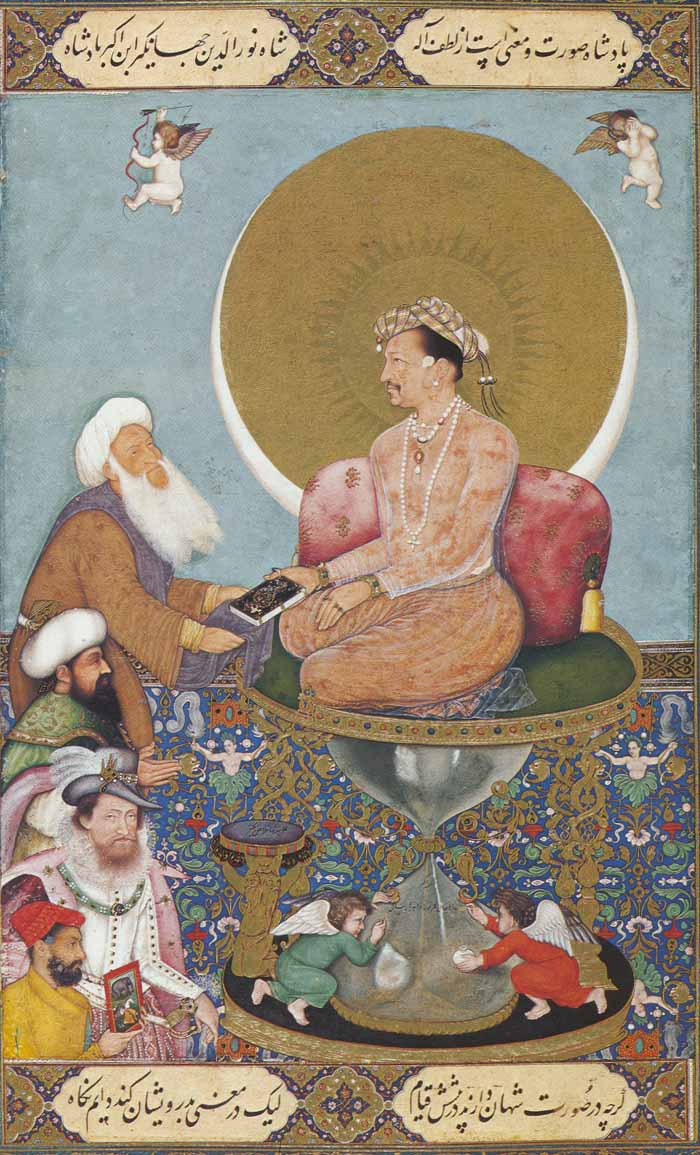
A Mughal miniature dated from the early 1620s depicting the Mughal emperor Jahangir (d. 1627) preferring a Sufi saint to his contemporary, the King of England James I (d. 1625); the picture is inscribed: "Though outwardly kings stand before him, he fixes his gazes on saints."

According to various traditional Sufi interpretations of the Quran, the concept of sainthood is clearly described. Some modern scholars, however, assert that the Quran does not explicitly outline a doctrine or theory of saints. In the Quran, the adjective walī is applied to God, in the sense of him being the "friend" of all believers (Q2:257). However, particular Quranic verses were interpreted by early Islamic scholars to refer to a special, exalted group of holy people. These included 10:62: "Surely God's friends (awliyāa l-lahi): no fear shall be on them, neither shall they sorrow," and 5:54, which refers to God's love for those who love him. Additionally, some scholars interpreted 4:69, "Whosoever obeys God and the Messenger, they are with those unto whom God hath shown favor: the prophets and the ṣidīqīna and the martyrs and the righteous. The best of company are they," to carry a reference to holy people who were not prophets and were ranked below the latter. The word ṣidīqīna in this verse literally connotes "the truthful ones" or "the just ones," and was often interpreted by the early Islamic thinkers in the sense of "saints," with the famous Quran translator Marmaduke Pickthall rendering it as "saints" in their interpretations of the scripture. Furthermore, the Quran referred to the miracles of saintly people who were not prophets like Khidr (18:65-82) and the People of the Cave (18:7-26), which also led many early scholars to deduce that a group of venerable people must exist who occupy a rank below the prophets but are nevertheless exalted by God. The references in the corpus of hadith literature to bona fide saints like the pre-Islamic Jurayj̲, only lent further credence to this early understanding of saints.

Collected stories about the "lives or vitae of the saints", began to be compiled "and transmitted at an early stage" by many regular Muslim scholars, including Ibn Abi al-Dunya (d. 894), who wrote a work entitled Kitāb al-Awliyāʾ (Lives of the Saints) in the ninth-century, which constitutes "the earliest [complete] compilation on the theme of God's friends." Prior to Ibn Abi al-Dunya's work, the stories of the saints were transmitted through oral tradition; but after the composition of his work, many Islamic scholars began writing down the widely circulated accounts, with later scholars like Abū Nuʿaym al-Iṣfahānī (d. 948) making extensive use of Ibn Abi al-Dunya's work in his own Ḥilyat al-awliyāʾ (The Adornment of the Saints). It is, moreover, evident from the Kitāb al-Kas̲h̲f wa 'l-bayān of the early Baghdadi Sufi mystic Abu Sa'id al-Kharraz (d. 899) that a cohesive understanding of the Muslim saints was already in existence, with al-Kharraz spending ample space distinguishing between the virtues and miracles (karāmāt) of the prophets and the saints. The genre of hagiography (manāḳib) only became more popular with the passage of time, with numerous prominent Islamic thinkers of the medieval period devoting large works to collecting stories of various saints or to focusing upon "the marvelous aspects of the life, the miracles or at least the prodigies of a [specific] Ṣūfī or of a saint believed to have been endowed with miraculous powers."

In the late ninth-century, important thinkers in Sunni Islam officially articulated the previously-oral doctrine of an entire hierarchy of saints, with the first written account of this hierarchy coming from the pen of al-Hakim al-Tirmidhi (d. 907-912). With the general consensus of Islamic scholars of the period accepting that the ulema were responsible for maintaining the "exoteric" part of Islamic orthodoxy, including the disciplines of law and jurisprudence, while the Sufis were responsible for articulating the religion's deepest inward truths, later prominent mystics like Ibn Arabi (d. 1240) only further reinforced this idea of a saintly hierarchy, and the notion of "types" of saints became a mainstay of Sunni mystical thought, with such types including the ṣiddīqūn ("the truthful ones") and the abdāl ("the substitute-saints"), amongst others. Many of these concepts appear in writing far before al-Tirmidhi and Ibn Arabi; the idea of the abdāl, for example, appears as early as the Musnad of Ibn Hanbal (d. 855), where the word signifies a group of major saints "whose number would remain constant, one always being replaced by some other on his death." It is, in fact, reported that Ibn Hanbal explicitly identified his contemporary, the mystic Maruf Karkhi (d. 815-20), as one of the abdal, saying: "He is one of the substitute-saints, and his supplication is answered."

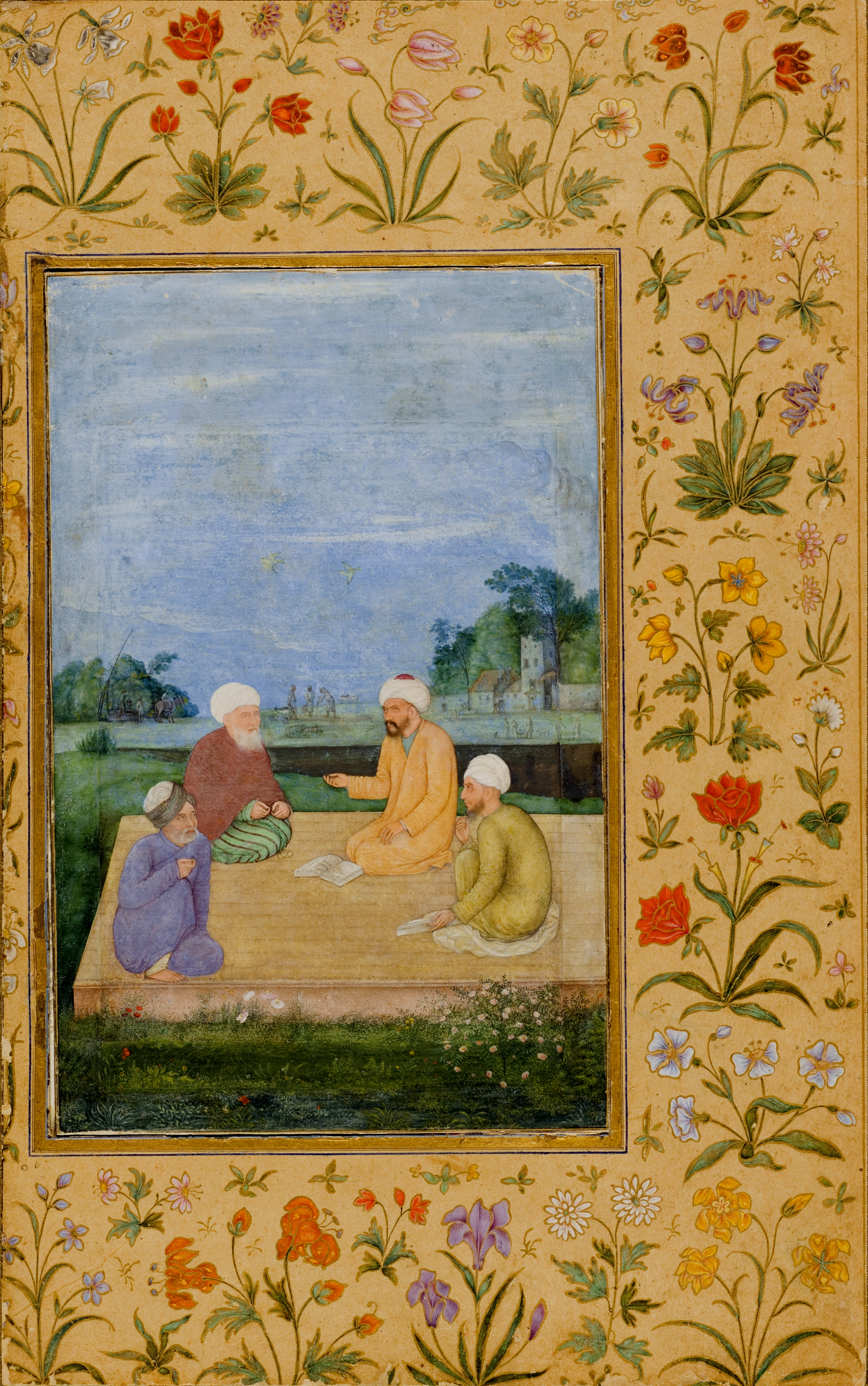
A Mughal miniature of A Discourse between Muslim Sages (ca. 1630), thought to be executed by the court painter Govārdhan.

From the twelfth to the fourteenth century, "the general veneration of saints, among both people and sovereigns, reached its definitive form with the organization of Sufism—the mysticism of Islam—into orders or brotherhoods." In general Islamic piety of the period, the saint was understood to be "a contemplative whose state of spiritual perfection ... [found] permanent expression in the teaching bequeathed to his disciples." It was by virtue of his spiritual wisdom that the saint was accorded veneration in medieval Islam, "and it is this which ... [effected] his 'canonization,' and not some ecclesiastical institution" as in Christianity. In fact, the latter point represents one of the crucial differences between the Islamic and Christian veneration of saints, for saints are venerated by unanimous consensus or popular acclaim in Islam, in a manner akin to all those Christian saints who began to be venerated prior to the institution of canonization. In fact, a belief in the existence of saints became such an important part of medieval Islam that many of the most important creeds articulated during the time period, like the famous Creed of Tahawi, explicitly declared it a requirement for being an "orthodox" Muslim to believe in the existence and veneration of saints and in the traditional narratives of their lives and miracles. Hence, we find that even medieval critics of the widespread practice of venerating the tombs of saints, like Ibn Taymiyyah (d. 1328), never denied the existence of saints as such, with the Hanbali jurist stating: "The miracles of saints are absolutely true and correct, by the acceptance of all Muslim scholars. And the Qur'an has pointed to it in different places, and the sayings of the Prophet have mentioned it, and whoever denies the miraculous power of saints are only people who are innovators and their followers." In the words of one contemporary academic, practically all Muslims of that era believed that "the lives of saints and their miracles were incontestable."

In the modern world, the traditional idea of saints in Islam has been challenged by the puritanical and revivalist Islamic movements of Salafism and Wahhabism, whose influence has "formed a front against the veneration and theory of saints." For the adherents of Wahhabi ideology, for example, the practice of venerating saints appears as an "abomination", for they see in this a form of idolatry. It is for this reason that the Kingdom of Saudi Arabia, which adheres to the Wahhabi creed, "destroyed the tombs of saints wherever ... able" during its expansion in the Arabian Peninsula from the eighteenth-century onwards. (Note: For further informations, see the articles Muhammad ibn Abd al-Wahhab, Demolition of al-Baqi, Destruction of early Islamic heritage sites in Saudi Arabia, and Persecution of Sufis.) As has been noted by scholars, the development of these movements have indirectly led to a trend amongst some mainstream Muslims to also resist "acknowledging the existence of Muslim saints altogether or ... [to view] their presence and veneration as unacceptable deviations." At the same time, the movement of Islamic Modernism has also opposed the traditional veneration of saints, for many proponents of this ideology regard the practice as "being both un-Islamic and backwards ... rather than the integral part of Islam which they were for over a millennium." Despite the presence, however, of these opposing streams of thought, the classical doctrine of saint-veneration continues to thrive in many parts of the Islamic world today, playing a vital part in the daily piety of vast portions of Muslim countries like Pakistan, Bangladesh, Egypt, Turkey, Senegal, Iraq, Iran, Algeria, Tunisia, Indonesia, Malaysia, and Morocco, as well as in countries with substantive Islamic populations like India, China, Russia, and the Balkans.

== Definitions ==
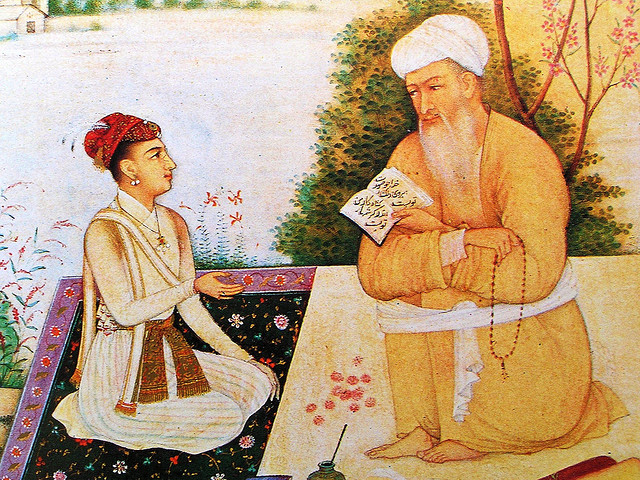
Detail from an Indian miniature depicting the Mughal prince Dara Shikoh (d. 1659) seeking the advice of a local saint named Mian Mir (d. 1635), undated but perhaps from the late seventeenth-century

The general definition of the Muslim saint in classical texts is that he represents a "[friend of God] marked by [special] divine favor ... [and] holiness", being specifically "chosen by God and endowed with exceptional gifts, such as the ability to work miracles." Moreover, the saint is also portrayed in traditional hagiographies as one who "in some way ... acquires his Friend's, i.e. God's, good qualities, and therefore he possesses particular authority, forces, capacities and abilities." Amongst classical scholars, Qushayri (d. 1073) defined the saint as someone "whose obedience attains permanence without interference of sin; whom God preserves and guards, in permanent fashion, from the failures of sin through the power of acts of obedience." Elsewhere, the same author quoted an older tradition in order to convey his understanding of the purpose of saints, which states: "The saints of God are those who, when they are seen, God is remembered."

Meanwhile, al-Hakim al-Tirmidhi (d. 869), the most significant ninth-century expositor of the doctrine, posited six common attributes of true saints (not necessarily applicable to all, according to the author, but nevertheless indicative of a significant portion of them), which are: (1) when people see him, they are automatically reminded of God; (2) anyone who advances towards him in a hostile way is destroyed; (3) he possesses the gift of clairvoyance (firāsa); (4) he receives divine inspiration (ilhām), to be strictly distinguished from revelation proper (waḥy), with the latter being something only the prophets receive; (5) he can work miracles (karāmāt) by the leave of God, which may differ from saint to saint, but may include marvels such as walking on water (al-mas̲h̲y ʿalā 'l-māʾ) and shortening space and time (ṭayy al-arḍ); and (6) he associates with Khidr. Al-Tirmidhi states, furthermore, that although the saint is not sinless like the prophets, he or she can nevertheless be "preserved from sin" (maḥfūz) by the grace of God. The contemporary scholar of Sufism Martin Lings described the Islamic saints as "the great incarnations of the Islamic ideal.... spiritual giants with which almost every generation was blessed."

=== Classical testimonies ===
The doctrine of saints, and of their miracles, seems to have been taken for granted by many of the major authors of the Islamic Golden Age (ca. 700–1400), as well as by many prominent late-medieval scholars. The phenomena in traditional Islam can be at least partly ascribed to the writings of many of the most prominent Sunni theologians and doctors of the classical and medieval periods, many of whom considered the belief in saints to be "orthodox" doctrine. Examples of classical testimonies include:

- "God has saints (awliyā) whom He has specially distinguished by His friendship and whom He has chosen to be the governors of His kingdom… He has made the saints governors of the universe… Through the blessing of their advent the rain falls from heaven, and through the purity of their lives the plants spring up from the earth, and through their spiritual influence the Muslims gain victories over the truth concealers" (Hujwiri [d. 1072-7]; Sunni Hanafi jurist and mystic)
- "The miracles of the saints (awliyā) are a reality. The miracle appears on behalf of the saint by way of contradicting the customary way of things.... And such a thing is reckoned as an evidentiary miracle on behalf of the Messenger to one of whose people this act appears, because it is evident from it that he is a saint, and he could never be a saint unless he were right in his religion; and his religion is the confession of the message of the Messenger" (al-Nasafī [d. 1142], Creed XV; Sunni Hanafi theologian)
- "The miracles of saints are absolutely true and correct, and acknowledged by all Muslim scholars. The Qur'an has pointed to it in different places, and the Hadith of the Prophet have mentioned it, and whoever denies the miraculous power of saints are innovators or following innovators" (Ibn Taymiyya [d. 1328], Mukhtasar al-Fatawa al-Masriyya; Sunni Hanbali theologian and jurisconsult)

=== Seeking of blessings ===
The rationale for veneration of deceased saints by pilgrims in an appeal for blessings (Barakah) even though the saints will not rise from the dead until the Day of Resurrection (Yawm ad-Dīn) may come from the hadith that states "the Prophets are alive in their graves and they pray". (According to the Islamic concept of Punishment of the Grave—established by hadith—the dead are still conscious and active, with the wicked suffering in their graves as a prelude to hell and the pious at ease.) According to Islamic historian Jonathan A.C. Brown, "saints are thought to be no different" than prophets, "as able in death to answer invocations for assistance" as they were while alive.

== Types and hierarchy ==
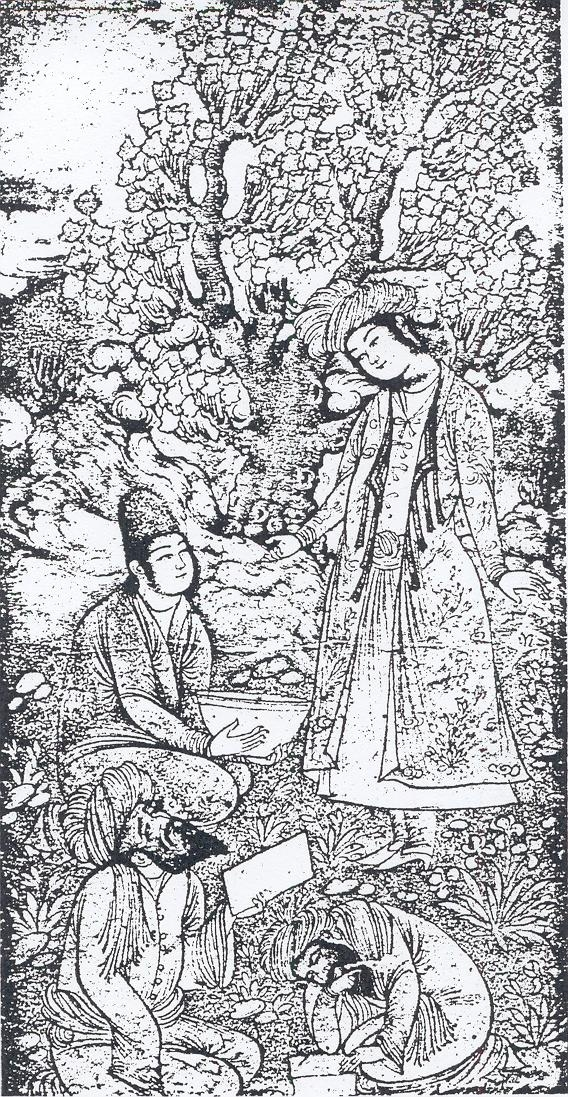
A drawing of The Two Poet Saints Hafez and Saadi Shirazi (ca. 17th century), thought to be executed by Muhammad Qāsim

Saints were envisaged to be of different "types" in classical Islamic tradition. Aside from their earthly differences as regard their temporal duty (i.e. jurist, hadith scholar, judge, traditionist, historian, ascetic, poet), saints were also distinguished cosmologically as regards their celestial function or standing. In Islam, however, the saints are represented in traditional texts as serving separate celestial functions, in a manner similar to the angels, and this is closely linked to the idea of a celestial hierarchy in which the various types of saints play different roles. A fundamental distinction was described in the ninth century by al-Tirmidhi in his Sīrat al-awliyāʾ (Lives of the Saints), who distinguished between two principal varieties of saints: the walī ḥaḳḳ Allāh on the one hand and the walī Allāh on the other. According to the author, "the [spiritual] ascent of the walī ḥaḳḳ Allāh must stop at the end of the created cosmos ... he can attain God's proximity, but not God Himself; he is only admitted to God's proximity (muḳarrab). It is the walī Allāh who reaches God. Ascent beyond God's throne means to traverse consciously the realms of light of the Divine Names.... When the walī Allāh has traversed all the realms of the Divine Names, i.e. has come to know God in His names as completely as possible, he is then extinguished in God's essence. His soul, his ego, is eliminated and ... when he acts, it is God Who acts through him. And so the state of extinction means at the same time the highest degree of activity in this world."

Although the doctrine of the hierarchy of saints is already found in written sources as early as the eighth-century, it was al-Tirmidhi who gave it its first systematic articulation. According to the author, forty major saints, whom he refers to by the various names of ṣiddīḳīn, abdāl, umanāʾ, and nuṣaḥāʾ, were appointed after the death of Muhammad to perpetuate the knowledge of the divine mysteries vouchsafed to them by the prophet. These forty saints, al-Tirmidhi stated, would be replaced in each generation after their earthly death; and, according to him, "the fact that they exist is a guarantee for the continuing existence of the world." Among these forty, al-Tirmidhi specified that seven of them were especially blessed. Despite their exalted nature, however, al-Tirmidhi emphasized that these forty saints occupied a rank below the prophets. Later important works which detailed the hierarchy of saints were composed by the mystic ʿAmmār al-Bidlīsī (d. between 1194 and 1207), the spiritual teacher of Najmuddin Kubra (d. 1220), and by Ruzbihan Baqli (d. 1209), who evidently knew of "a highly developed hierarchy of God's friends." The differences in terminology between the various celestial hierarchies presented by these authors were reconciled by later scholars through their belief that the earlier mystics had highlighted particular parts and different aspects of a single, cohesive hierarchy of saints.

=== Sufism ===
The goal of the Sufi path is to achieve unification of the self with God (fanāʾ). The concept is often described in Sufi allegories as the self mirroring the light of God. Accordingly, the soul is tainted and in need of purification. In the purified state of the Sufi saint, the Sufi's spotless mind realizes that it has no real existence in itself; his existence is only God's light and he is only the mirror.

In certain esoteric teachings of Islam, there is said to be a cosmic spiritual hierarchy whose ranks include walis (saints, friends of God), abdals (changed ones), headed by a ghawth (helper) or qutb (pole, axis). The details vary according to the source.

One source is the 12th Century Persian Ali Hujwiri. In his divine court, there are three hundred akhyār ("excellent ones"), forty abdāl ("substitutes"), seven abrār ("piously devoted ones"), four awtād ("pillars"), three nuqabā ("leaders") and one qutb.

All these saints know one another and cannot act without mutual consent. It is the task of the Awtad to go round the whole world every night, and if there should be any place on which their eyes have not fallen, next day some flaw will appear in that place, and they must then inform the Qutb in order that he may direct his attention to the weak spot and that by his blessings the imperfection may be remedied.

Another is from Ibn Arabi, who lived in Moorish Spain. It has a more exclusive structure. There are eight nujabā ("nobles"), twelve nuqabā, seven abdāl, four awtād, two a'immah ("guides"), and the qutb.

According to the 20th-century Sufi Inayat Khan, there are seven degrees in the hierarchy. In ascending order, they are pir, buzurg, wali, ghaus, qutb, nabi and rasul He does not say how the levels are populated. Pirs and buzurgs assist the spiritual progress of those who approach them. Walis may take responsibility for protecting a community and generally work in secret. Qutbs are similarly responsible for large regions. Nabis are charged with bringing a reforming message to nations or faiths, and hence have a public role. Rasuls likewise have a mission of transformation of the world at large.

== Regional veneration ==
The amount of veneration a specific saint received varied from region to region in Islamic civilization, often on the basis of the saint's own history in that region. While the veneration of saints played a crucial role in the daily piety of Sunni Muslims all over the Islamic world for more than a thousand years (ca. 800–1800), exactly which saints were most widely venerated in any given cultural climate depended on the hagiographic traditions of that particular area. Thus, while Moinuddin Chishti (d. 1236), for example, was honored throughout the Sunni world in the medieval period, his cultus was especially prominent in the Indian subcontinent, as that is where he was believed to have preached, performed the majority of his miracles, and ultimately settled at the end of his life.

=== North Africa ===
The veneration of saints has played an essential role in the religious and social life of the Maghreb for about 1000 years; in other words, since Islam first reached the lands of North Africa in the eighth century. The first written references to ascetic Muslim saints in Africa, "popularly admired and with followings," appear in tenth-century hagiographies. As has been noted by scholars, however, "the phenomenon may well be older," for many of the stories of the Islamic saints were passed down orally before finally being put to writing. One of the most widely venerated saints in early North African Islamic history was Abū Yaʿzā (or Yaʿazzā, d. 1177), an illiterate Sunni Maliki miracle worker whose reputation for sanctity was admired even in his own life. Another immensely popular saint of the time-period was Ibn Ḥirzihim (d. 1163), who also gained renown for his personal devoutness and his ability to work miracles. It was Abu Madyan (d. 1197), however, who eventually became one of the Awliya Allah of the entire Maghreb. A "spiritual disciple of these two preceding saints," Abū Madyan, a prominent Sunni Maliki scholar, was the first figure in Maghrebi Sufism "to exercise an influence beyond his own region." Abū Madyan travelled to the East, where he is said to have met prominent mystics like the Hanbali jurist Abdul-Qadir Gilani (d. 1166). Upon returning to the Maghreb, Abū Madyan stopped at Béjaïa and "formed a circle of disciples." Abū Madyan eventually died in Tlemcen, while making his way to the Almohad court of Marrakesh; he was later venerated as a prime Awliya Allah of Tlemcen by popular acclaim.

One of Abū Madyan's most notable disciples was ʿAbd al-Salām Ibn Mas̲h̲īs̲h̲ (d. 1127), a "saint ... [who] had a posthumous fame through his being recognised as a master and a 'pole' by" Abu 'l-Ḥasan al-S̲h̲ād̲h̲ilī (d. 1258). It was this last figure who became the preeminent saint in Maghrebi piety, due to his being the founder of one of the most famous Sunni Sufi orders of North Africa: the Shadhiliyya tariqa. Adhering to the Maliki maddhab in its jurisprudence, the Shadhili order produced numerous widely honored Sunni saints in the intervening years, including Fāsī Aḥmad al-Zarrūq (d. 1494), who was educated in Egypt but taught in Libya and Morocco, and Abū ʿAbd Allāh Muḥammad al-Jazūlī (d. 1465), "who returned to Morocco after a long trip to the East and then began a life as a hermit," and who achieved widespread renown for the miracles he is said to have wrought by the leave of God. Eventually, the latter was buried in Marrakesh, where he ended up becoming of the city's seven most famous Awliya Allah for the Sunnis of the area. Some of the most popular and influential Maghrebi saints and mystics of the following centuries were Muḥammad b. Nāṣir (d. 1674), Aḥmad al-Tij̲ānī (d. 1815), Abū Ḥāmid al-ʿArabī al-Darqāwī (d. 1823), and Aḥmad b. ʿAlāwī (d. 1934), with the latter three originating Sufi orders of their own. Famous adherents of the Shadhili order amongst modern Islamic scholars include Abdallah Bin Bayyah (b. 1935), Muhammad Alawi al-Maliki (d. 2004), Hamza Yusuf (b. 1958), and Muhammad al-Yaqoubi (b. 1963).

The veneration of saints in Maghrebi Sunni Islam has been studied by scholars with regard to the various "types" of saints venerated by Sunnis in those areas. These include:

- the "pure, ascetic hermit," who is honored for having refused all ostentation, and is commemorated not on account of his written works but by virtue of the reputation he is believed to have had for personal sanctity, miracles, and "inward wisdom or gnosis";
- the "ecstatic and eccentric saint" (mad̲j̲d̲h̲ūb), who is believed to have maintained orthodoxy in his fulfillment of the pillars of the faith, but who is famous for having taught in an unusually direct style or for having divulged the highest truths before the majority in a manner akin to Hallaj (d. 922). Famous and widely venerated saints of this "type" include Ibn al-Marʾa (d. 1214), ʿAlī al-Ṣanhāj̲ī (ca. 16th-century), ʿAbd al-Raḥmān al-Mad̲j̲d̲h̲ūb (literally "ʿAbd al-Raḥmān the Ecstatic", d. 1569);
- the "warrior saint" (pl. murābiṭūn) or martyr;
- female saints, who may belong to one of the aforementioned three categories or some other. It has been remarked that "Maghrebi sainthood is by no means confined to men, and ... some of the tombs of female saints are very frequently visited."
- "Jewish saints", that is to say, venerable Jewish personages whose tombs are frequented by Sunni Muslims in the area for the seeking of blessings

Regarding the veneration of saints amongst Sunni Muslims in the Maghreb in the present day, scholars have noted the presence of many "thousands of minor, local saints whose tombs remain visible in villages or the quarters of towns." Although many of these saints lack precise historiographies or hagiographies, "their presence and their social efficacity ... [are] immense" in shaping the spiritual life of Muslims in the region. For the vast majority of Muslims in the Maghreb even today, the saints remain "very much alive at their tomb, to the point that the person's name most often serves to denote the place." While this classical type of Sunni veneration represents the most widespread stance in the area, the modern influence of Salafism and Wahhabism have challenged the traditional practice in some quarters.

=== Anatolia, the Balkans, and Caucasus ===
Scholars have noted the tremendously "important role" the veneration of saints has historically played in Islamic life all these areas, especially amongst Sunni Muslims who frequent the many thousands of tombs scattered throughout the region for blessings in performing the act of ziyāra. According to scholars, "between the Turks of the Balkans and Anatolia, and those in Central Asia, despite the distance separating them, the concept of the saint and the organisation of pilgrimages displays no fundamental differences." The veneration of Muslim saints really spread in Turkic-inhabited lands from the 10th to the 14th centuries, and played a crucial role in medieval Turkic Sunni piety not only in cosmopolitan cities but also "in rural areas and amongst nomads of the whole Turkish world." One of the reasons proposed by scholars for the popularity of Muslim saints in pre-modern Turkey is that Islam was majorly spread by the early Sunni Sufis in Turkic-inhabited lands, rather than by purely exoteric teachers. Most of the Muslim saints venerated in Turkey belonged to the Hanafi school of Sunni jurisprudence.

As scholars have noted, Muslim saints venerated in traditional Turkish Sunni Islam may be classified into three principal categories:

- (1) The g̲h̲āzīs or early Muslims saints who preached the faith in the region and were often martyred for their religion. Some of the most famous and widely venerated saints of this category include Muhammad's companion Abū Ayyūb al-Anṣārī (d. 674), who was killed beneath the walls of Constantinople and was honored as a martyr shortly thereafter, and Sayyid Baṭṭāl G̲h̲āzī (d. ninth-century), who fought the Christians in Anatolia during the Umayyad period.
- (2) Sufi saints, who were most often Sunni mystics who belonged to the Hanafi school of Sunni jurisprudence and were attached to one of the orthodox Sufi orders like the Naqshbandi or the Mevlevi.
- (3) The "greats figures of Islam", both pre-Islamic and those who came after Muhammad, as well as certain sainted rulers.

== Reverence of Awliya Allah ==
Reverence for Awliya Allah have been an important part of both Sunni and Shia Islamic tradition that particularly important classical saints have served as the heavenly advocates for specific Muslim empires, nations, cities, towns, and villages. With regard to the sheer omnipresence of this belief, the late Martin Lings wrote: "There is scarcely a region in the empire of Islam which has not a Sufi for its Patron Saint." As the veneration accorded saints often develops purely organically in Islamic climates, the Awliya Allah are often recognized through popular acclaim rather than through official declaration. Traditionally, it has been understood that the Wali'Allah of a particular place prays for that place's well-being and for the health and happiness of all who live therein. Here is a partial list of Muslim Awliya Allah:

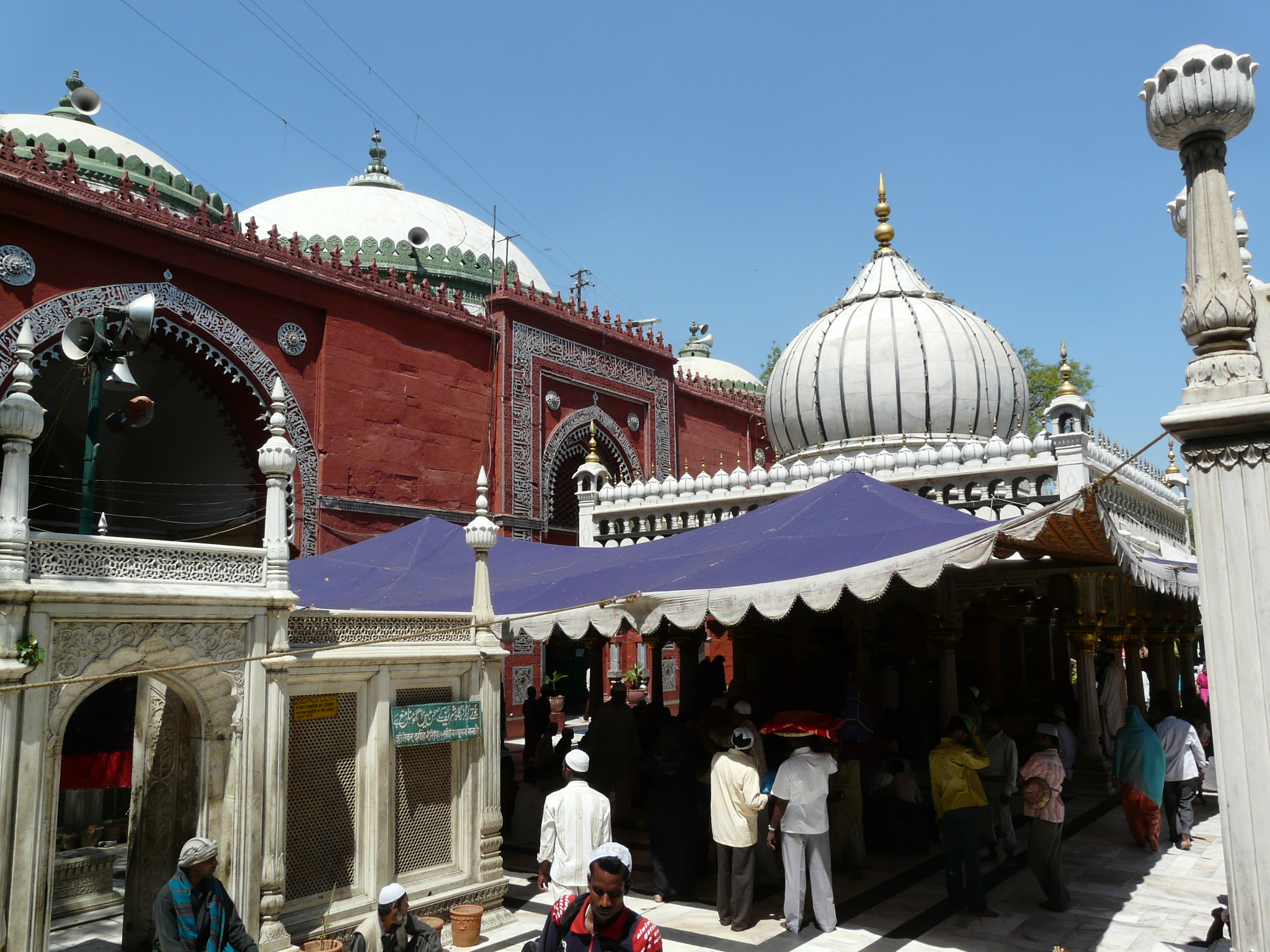
The shrine of Niẓām al-Dīn Awliyā (d. 1325) in Delhi, India, where he is honored as an Awliya Allah of the city; the shrine is the most popular site of Muslim pilgrimage in the Indian subcontinent

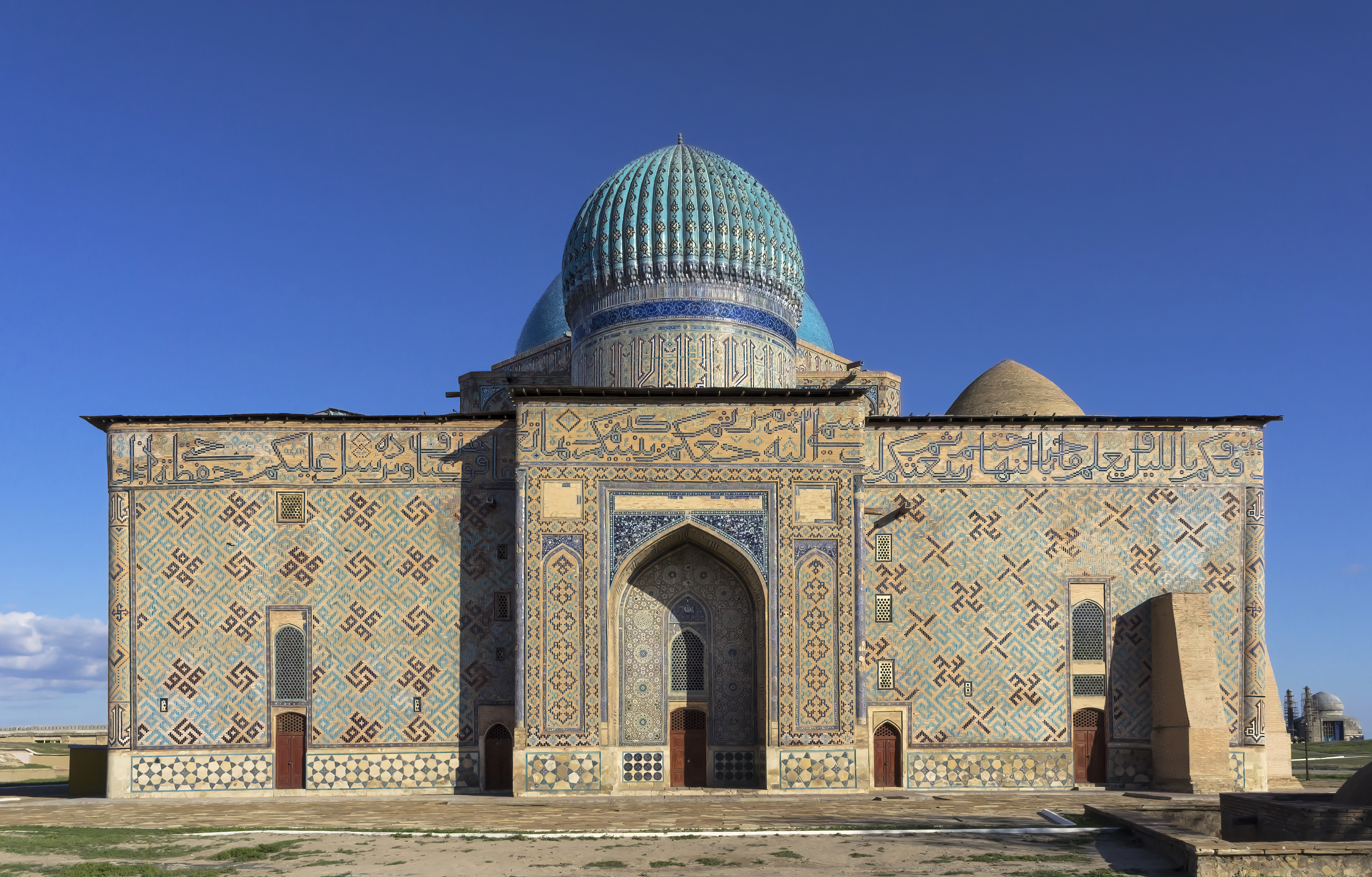
The shrine of Aḥmad Yesewī (d. 1166) in Turkistan, Kazakhstan, where he is honored as an Awliya Allah of the country; the shrine was commissioned by Timur in 1389

Country	Awliya Allah	Life dates	Notes	Location
Afghanistan	Ali ibn Abi Talib	d. 661	Cousin and son in law of Muhammad and 4th Rashidun Caliph. Believed to be buried in Mazar Sharif in Naqshbandi sunni belief.	Mazar Sharif, Balkh Province
Afghanistan	Mir Maudood Chishti	d. 1139	Chishti Sunni mystic, Mir of the descendants of the family of the 12th Imam, descending from Imam Hasan al Askari	Chisht in Herat Province.
Afghanistan	Sanā'ī	d. 1131/1141	Sunni mystic, Sufi poet	
Algeria	Abū Madyan	d. 1197–98	Sunni mystic of Maliki jurisprudence	City of Tlemcen; in the words of one scholar, "the city has grown and developed under the beneficent aegis of the great saint, and the town of al-ʿUbbād has grown up round his tomb"
Algeria	ʿAbd al-Raḥmān al-T̲h̲aʿālibī	d. c. 1200	Sunni mystic of Maliki jurisprudence	City of Algiers
Bangladesh	Shah Jalal	d. 1347	Sufi saint and mystic of the Suhrawardiyya order, born in modern-day Turkey he travelled to the Indian subcontinent and settled in the North-East Bengal and Assam spreading Islam across the area and became the main guide to the new Muslim population of Eastern Bengal.	
Bangladesh	Khan Jahan Ali	d. 1459	Born in modern Uzbekistan, he travelled to southern Bengal to spread Islam; he built the mosque city of Bagerhat and cleared the Sunderbans for human settlement. He developed southern Bengal by linking Bagerghat to the trade city of Chittagong and Sonargaon and introduced Islamic education there.	
Bangladesh	Akhi Siraj Aainae Hind	d. 14 century	Sufi saint (born in Gaur, West Bengal) of the Chishti order, he spread Islam across Northern Bengal and Western Bihar, he was also the administrator of Northern Bengal under the Sultan Shamsuddin Ilyas Shah developing the area. His dargah in Malda is one of the largest in South Asia and gathers thousands a year.	
Egypt	Abu'l-Ḥasan al-S̲h̲ād̲h̲ilī	d. 1258	Sunni mystic of Maliki jurisprudence and founder of the Shadiliyya tariqa	Many parts of Upper Egypt, but particularly among the ʿAbābda tribe
Egypt	Abū l-Ḥajjāj of Luxor	d. 1244	Sunni mystic of Maliki jurisprudence	City of Luxor
Egypt	ʿAbd al-Raḥīm of Qena	d. 1196	Sunni mystic of Maliki jurisprudence, and famous defender of orthodoxy in the area	City of Qena
Ethiopia	Abādir ʿUmar al-Riḍā	d. c. 1300	Sunni mystic of Shafi'i jurisprudence	City of Harar; according to one scholar, "Harar later came to be known as Madīnat al-Awliyāʾ ('the city of saints') for the shrines of hundreds of saints in and around Harar"
Somalia	Abū Barakāt Yūsuf Al-Kawnayn Al-Barbari	d. c. 1200	Sunni saint and scholar of Shafi'i jurisprudence. He is considered the forefather of the Walashma Dynasty.	Travelled a lot from Harar, Zeila, Baghdad, Dhogor and even Maldives, where he spread Islam.
Somalia	Ash-Shaykh Diyā Ud-Dīn Ishāq Ibn Ahmad Ar-Ridhāwi Al-Maytī	d. c. 1300	Sunni scholar and traveler of Husaynid lineage. He is the eponymous ancestor of the isaaq clan-family.	Travelled from Hijāz, to Yaman, Bilād Al-Habasha and finally the city of Maydh.
India	Niẓām al-Dīn Awliyā	d. 1325	Sunni mystic of Hanafi jurisprudence	City of Delhi
India	S̲h̲āh al-Ḥamīd ʿAbd al-Ḳādir	ob. 1600	Sunni mystic of Shafi'i jurisprudence	Town of Nagore
India	Chishtī Muʿīn al-Dīn Ḥasan Sijzī		Mystic of Chishti order	City of Ajmer
India	Mu'in al-Din Hadi Naqshband Mirza		Mystic of Naqshbandi order and son in law of Emperor Jahangir; Buried alongside 3 generations of his successors in the Ziyarat Naqshband Memorial Complex	City of Srinagar
India	Bābā Nūr al-Dīn Ris̲h̲ī	d. 1377	Sunni ascetic and mystic	Town of Bijbehara
India	Maulana Shahbaz Muhammad	d. 1640	16th–17th century Shattari and Qadiri Sufi saint and scholar.	Bhagalpur, Bihar
Iran	Daniel	d. 600 BCE	Hebrew prophet who is venerated in Islamic tradition	City of Shush, where the most popular shrine devoted to him is located
Iraq	Husayn ibn Ali	d. 680	grandson of Muhammad and Third imam for Shia Muslims	All Iraq for both Shia and Sunni Muslims, but especially the city of Karbala
Iraq	ʿAbd al-Qādir al-Jīlānī	d. 1166	Sunni mystic and jurist of Hanbali jurisprudence and founder of the Qadiriyya tariqa	All Iraq in classical Sunni piety, but especially the city of Baghdad
Kazakhstan	Aḥmad Yesewī	d. 1166	Sunni mystic of Hanafi jurisprudence and founder of the Yesewīyya tariqa	All of Kazakhstan; additionally, venerated as the Wali of all the modern nation states comprising the pre-modern Turkestan
Morocco	Abū S̲h̲uʿayb Ayyūb b. Saʿīd al-Ṣinhāj̲ī (in the vernacular "Mūlāy Būs̲h̲ʿīb")	d. c. 1100	Sunni mystic of Maliki jurisprudence	City of Azemmour
Morocco	Ḥmād u-Mūsā	d. 1563	Sunni mystic of Maliki jurisprudence and the Shadiliyya tariqa	Region of Sous
Morocco	Aḥmad b. Jaʿfar al-Ḵh̲azrajī Abu 'l-ʿAbbās al-Sabtī	d. 1205	Sunni mystic of Maliki jurisprudence	City of Marrakesh
Morocco	Sidi Belliūt	d. c. 1500 [?]	Sunni mystic of Maliki jurisprudence	City of Casablanca
Morocco	Ibn ʿĀs̲h̲ir	d. 1362–63	Sunni mystic of Maliki jurisprudence	City of Salé
Morocco	Abū Muḥammad Ṣāliḥ |d. 1500 [?]	Sunni mystic of Maliki jurisprudence	City of Safi	
Morocco	Mūlāy ʿAlī Bū G̲h̲ālem	d. 1200 [?]	Sunni mystic of Maliki jurisprudence	Town of Alcazarquivir
Morocco	Idris I of Morocco	d. 791	First Islamic ruler and founder of the Idrisid dynasty	City of Fez
Morocco	ʿAbd al-Ḳādir Muḥammad	d. c. 1500 [?]	Sunni mystic of Maliki jurisprudence	Town of Figuig
Morocco	Muḥammad b. ʿĪsā	d. 16th century	Sunni mystic of Maliki jurisprudence	City of Meknes
Nigeria	Muhammad ibn al-Sabbagh (in Hausa Dan Marina)	fl. 1640	Sunni mystic of Maliki jurisprudence	City of Katsina
Nigeria	Dan Masanih	1595 – 1667	Sunni mystic of Maliki jurisprudence	City of Katsina
Pakistan	ʿAbd Allāh S̲h̲āh G̲h̲āzī	d. c. 800	Early Muslim mystic and preacher	City of Karachi
Pakistan	Abu 'l-Ḥasan Ali Huj̲wīrī	d. 1072–1077	Sunni mystic of Hanafi jurisprudence; often referred to as Dātā Ganj̲bak̲h̲s̲h̲ by Pakistanis	City of Lahore
Pakistan	ʿAbd Allāh S̲h̲āh Qādri	d. 1757	Muslim Sufi poet and philosopher of Qadiriyya tariqa	City of Kasur
Pakistan	Bahāʾ al-Dīn Zakarīyā	d. 1170	Sunni mystic of Hanafi jurisprudence and the Suhrawardiyya tariqa	Vast areas of south-west Punjab and Sindh
Pakistan	Lāl Shāhbāz Q̣alandar	d. 1275	Sunni mystic of Hanafi jurisprudence	City of Sehwan Sharif
Pakistan	Bilāwal S̲h̲āh Nūraniʾ	d. ?	Sufi mystic buried in Lahoot Lamakan	City of Khuzdar
Pakistan	HH The Hazrat Ishaan	d. 1642	Aristocrat and Patron Saint of the Mughal Emperors and Shaybanid Khans of Bukhara buried alongside his successor Khwaja Khawand Ahmad Hazrat Ishaan III, Khwaja Bahauddin Thani Hazrat Ishaan IV, Sayyid Mir Jan Hazrat Ishaan VIII and Mir Mahmud Agha Hazrat Ishaan IX in Begampura	City of Lahore
Pakistan	Sheikh Rahamkar	d. 1653	Sunni mystic and pir	City of Nowshera
Pakistan	S̲h̲āh Qabūl ʾAwliyāʾ	d. 1767	Sunni mystic and pir	City of Peshawar
Pakistan	Jalālʾ al-Dīn Surk͟h Poṣ	d. 1295	Sufi saint and missionary	City of Uch Sharif
Syria	Arslān of Damascus	d. 1160–1164	Sunni mystic	City of Damascus
Tunisia	Muḥriz b. K̲h̲alaf	d. 1022	Sunni mystic of Maliki jurisprudence	City of Tunis
Tunisia	Sīdī al-Māzarī	d. 1300 [?]	Sunni mystic of Maliki jurisprudence	City of Monastir
Tunisia	ʿAbd Allāh Abu 'l-Jimāl	d. 1500 [?]	Sunni mystic of Maliki jurisprudence	City of Khroumire
Tunisia	Boulbaba	d. 7th century	According to tradition, a companion of Muhammad	City of Gabès
Turkey	Ḥājjī Bayrām Walī	d. 1429–30	Sunni mystic of Hanafi jurisprudence	City of Ankara
Turkey	Emīr Sulṭān	d. 1455	Sunni mystic of Hanafi jurisprudence	City of Bursa
Turkey	Miskin Baba	d. 1858–59	Sunni mystic of Hanafi jurisprudence	Island of Ada Kaleh, which was at one time under the control of the Ottoman Empire; island was submerged in 1970 during the construction of the Iron Gate I Hydroelectric Power Station
Turkey	Jalāl ad-Dīn Mohammad Rūmī	d. 1273	Hanafi mystic of Maturidi creed	City of Konya
Uzbekistan	Qutham b. ʿAbbās	d. 676	Early Muslim martyr	City of Samarkand
Uzbekistan	Zangī Ātā	d. 1269	Sunni mystic of Hanafi jurisprudence	City of Tashkent
Yemen	Muḥammad b. ʿAlī Bā ʿAlāwī	d. 1255	Sunni mystic of Shafi'i jurisprudence and founder of the ʿAlāwiyya tariqa in Hadhramaut	Region of Hadhramaut
Yemen	S̲h̲aik̲h̲ Ṣadīq	d. 1500 [?]	Sunni mystic	City of Al Hudaydah
Yemen	ʿAlī b. ʿUmar al-S̲h̲ād̲h̲ilī	d. 1400 [?]	Sunni mystic of the Shadiliyya tariqa	Port-city of Mokha
Yemen	Abū Bakr al-ʿAydarūs	d. 1508	Sunni mystic of Shafi'i jurisprudence	City of Aden

== See also ==
- Amir al-Mu'minin
- List of Sufi saints
- List of Sufis
- Mawla
- Pir
- Wali (Islamic legal guardian)
- Wali (administrative title)
- Wali al-Ahd
- Wali Sanga
- The Verse of Wilayah
