= Hazrat Ishaan =

Sufi saint from Bokhara (1563–1642)

Hazrat Ishaan Khawand Mahmud
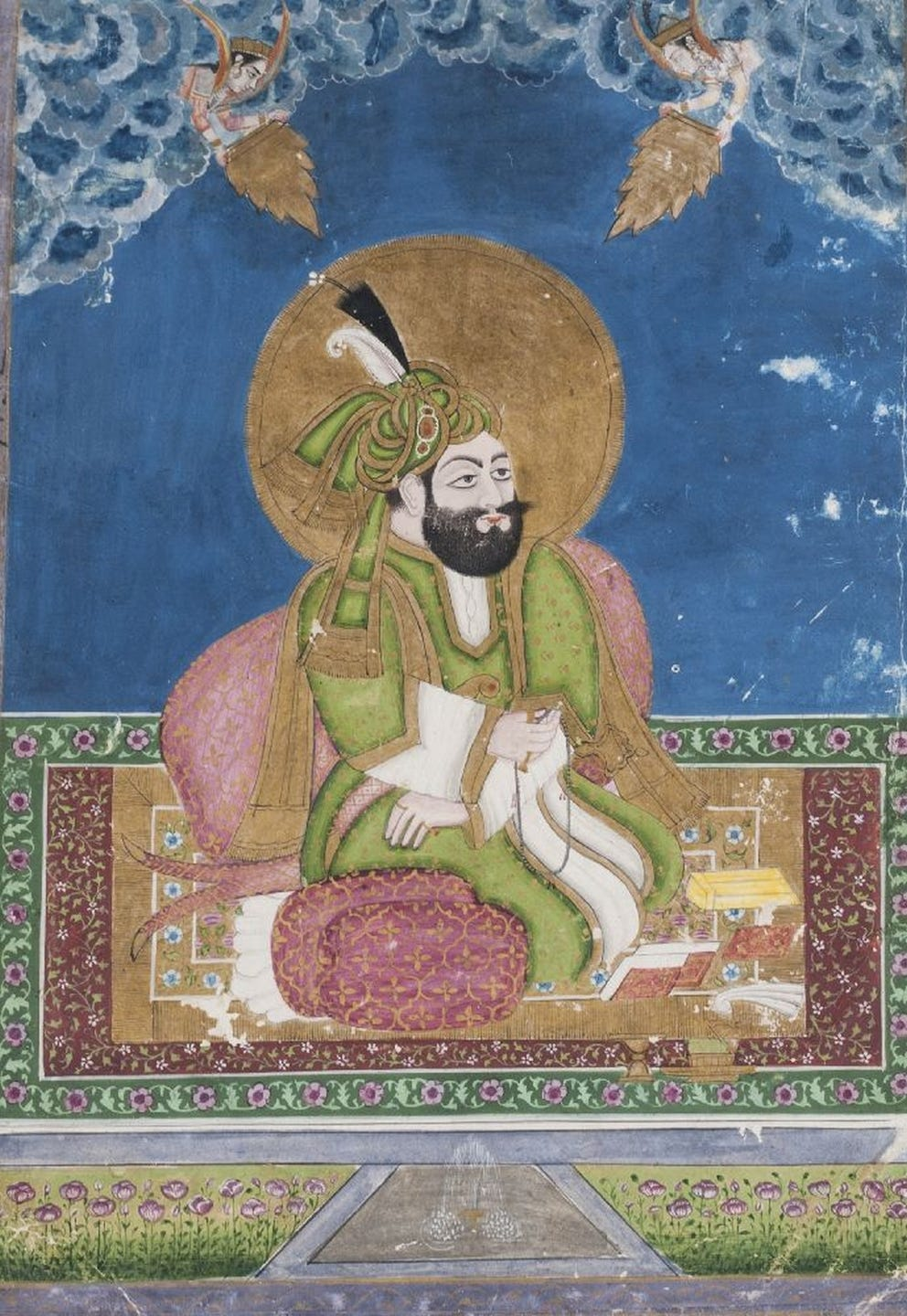
- Portrait of Khawand Mahmud

Personal life
- Born: 1563 Bukhara, Khanate of Bukhara
- Died: 4 November 1642 (aged 79) Lahore, Punjab, Mughal Empire
- Children: Moinuddin Hadi Naqshband
- Parent: Sayyid Sharif Naqshbandi

Religious life
- Religion: Islam

Muslim leader
- Predecessor: Khwaja Ishaq Dahbidi; Khwaja Bahauddin Naqshband (Uwaisiyya influence)
- Successor: Sayyid Moinuddin Hadi Naqshband; Sayyid Mir Jan (Uwaisiyya influence)

Hazrat Ishaan Khawand Mahmud (1563 — 4 November 1642) was a Sunni Muslim Wali (Sufi saint) from Bukhara, Uzbekistan and descendant of Bahauddin Naqshband, the founder of the Naqshbandi Sufi order.

== Biography ==
=== Spiritual journey ===
Hazat Ishaan was granted permission from his father to study in a royal college and became an accomplished scholar. At 23, Ishaan received a letter to visit his father and to accompany him in his last days. Upon his father's death, he traveled to Wakhsh, where he became Shaykh al-Islam. While staying in Wakhsh, he came to know Khwaja Hajji. They met again in Balkh, where Hajji introduced him to his future master Khwaja Ishaq Dahbidi. He met Dahbidi again in Bokhara and became his disciple. After twelve years of training, Ishaan reached the level of a Sufi Shaykh in 1598. Dahbidi welcomed him, and upon hearing his advice, Ishaan travelled towards Lahore. Instead, he arrived in Srinagar, Kashmir. In Srinagar he attracted many people who later followed him. His fame reached across Central Asia.

=== Influence ===
Khawand Mahmud attracted hundreds of thousands of disciples in what is now Afghanistan, especially in Kandahar, Kabul, and Herat. He sent disciples around Central Asia, and two were sent to Tibet. Mahmud was invited by Moghul Emperor Jahangir to attend to his court in Agra. Attending there several times, he established connections to the court because Jahangir was his disciple. Jahangir believed in him, taught by his father Akbar that he was born through Ishaan's prayers when Akbar desperately wished for a child. Entangled in the struggle against the Shia community there, Moghul emperor Shah Jahan evacuated him in 1636 to Delhi. Ishaan spent his last six years in Lahore, where Jahangir's son Shah Jahan built a palace for him that later became his shrine. Mahmud had a significant influence over a long line of successors. Notable successors and descendants of Mahmud include his son Moinuddin Hadi Naqshband in Kashmir and Sayyid Mir Jan in Pakistan.

== Gallery ==
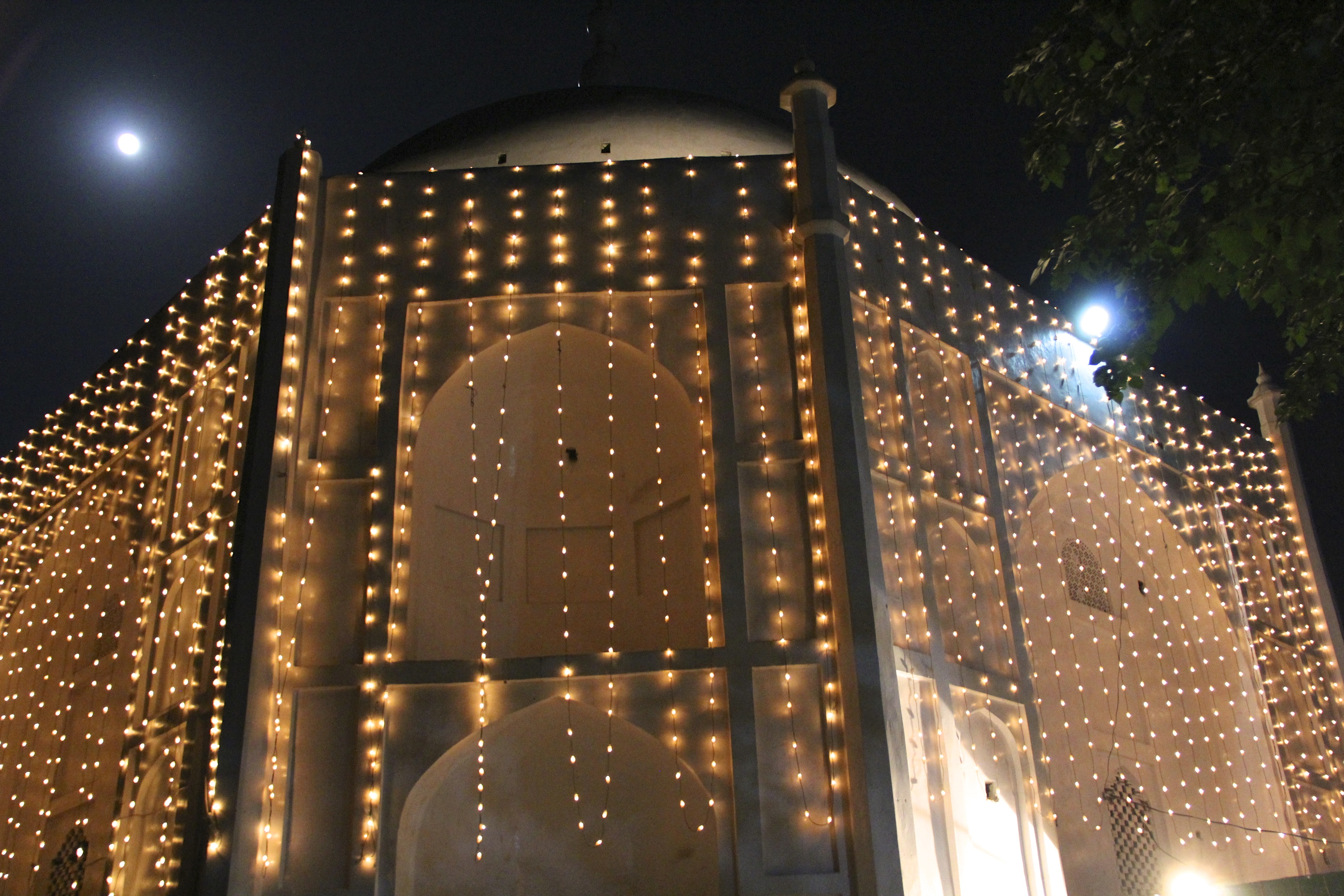
Shrine of Hazrat Ishaan

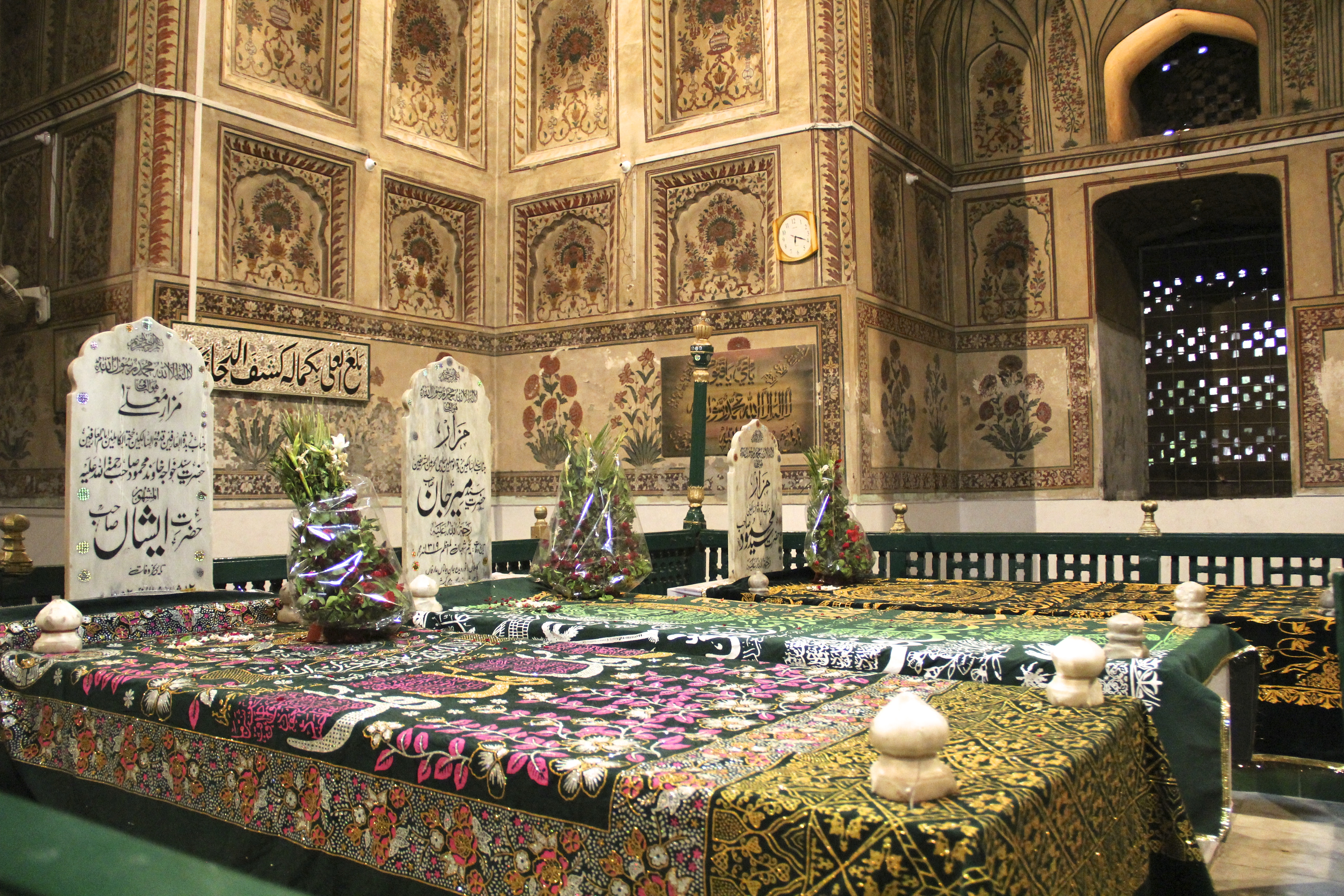
Graves of Hazrat Ishaan and his eighth generation descendants Sayyid Mir Jan and Sayyid Mahmud Agha

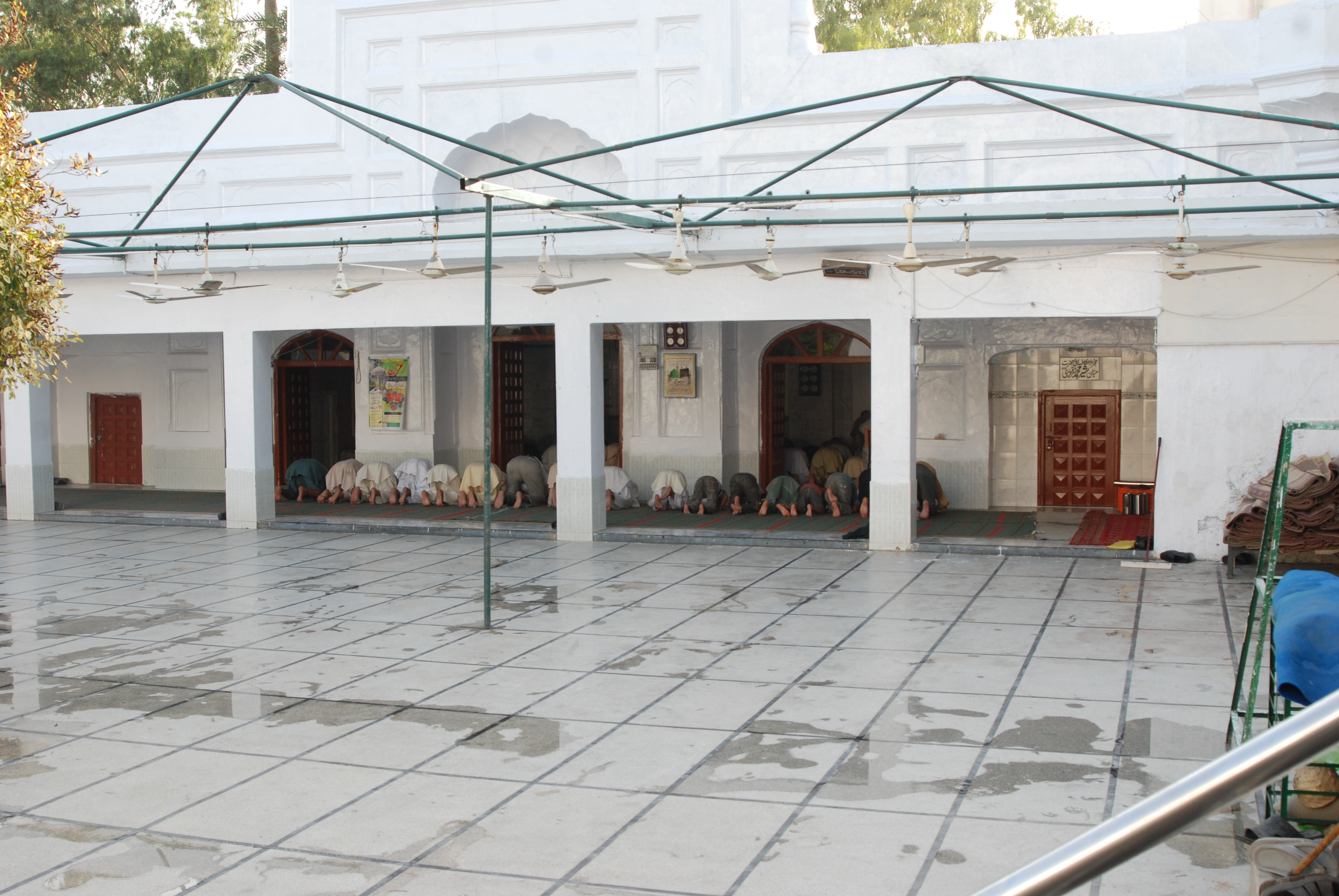
Mosque of the shrine

== See also ==
- Abdul Qadir Jilani
- Sayyid Ali Akbar
- Ali Hujwiri
- Bahauddin Naqshband
- Moinuddin Chishti
- Ziyarat Naqshband Sahab
- Sayyid Mir Jan
