= Ziyarat Naqshband Sahab =

Muslim shrine in Srinagar, India

Coordinates: 34.096657°N 74.8127635°E

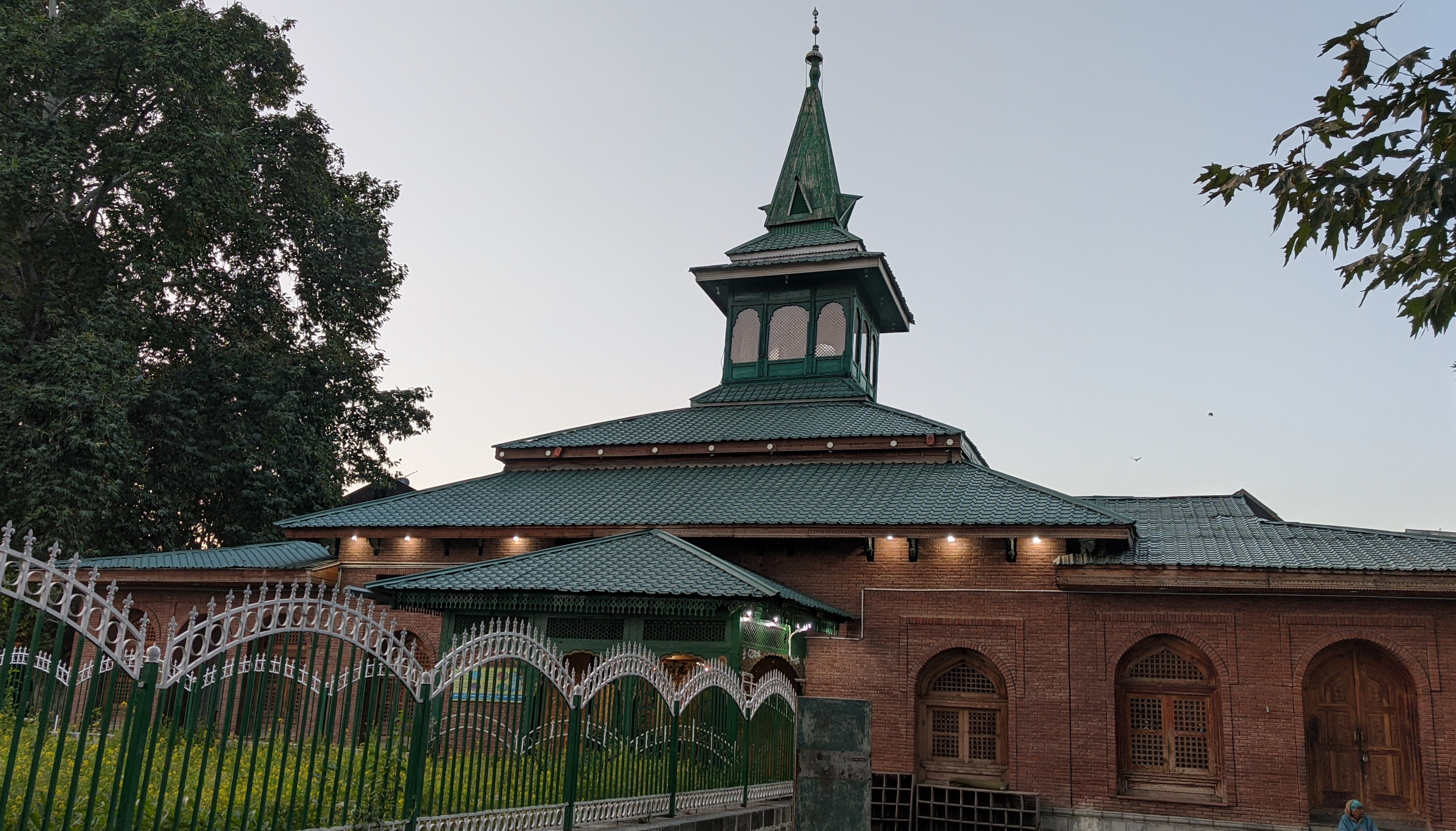
A view of Ziyarat Naqshband Sahab from its yard.

Ziyarat Naqshband Sahab is a Sunni Muslim shrine, or ziyarat in Srinagar in Jammu and Kashmir, India. It is the Dargah (Sufi Mausoleum) of 17th-century Sufi saint Moinuddin Hadi Naqshband.

== History ==
The area in which this shrine is built was called Sikander-pore because it was built by Sultan Sikandar (1389–1413) (Sikandar Butshikan). During the Chak times Sulatn Hussain Chak (1563–1570) built a garden in this area. According to Tareekh-e-Hassan, Zain-ul-Abidin (Budshah) had built a Shrine for Syed Mohammad Owaisi in Isham, Kashmir. Owaisi died in 1484 and that shrine was more or less abandoned. In 1633 Khawja Khawand Mahmood obtained a fatwa to demolish the old shrine and used the same material to build the present Naqhband shrine, in what at that time would have been Hussian Chaks old garden. Because of Khawja Khawand Mahmood's name the neighborhood is still called Khwaja Bazzar. After Khawja Khawand Mahmood's death in 1640 in Lahore, his son Khawaja Moin-Ud-Din Naqshbandi came to Kashmir to look after the shrine. He died in 1674 and is buried at the shrine. When the holy relic of prophet Mohammad's hair was brought to Kashmir in 1699, it was first kept at this shrine. There was not enough space to accommodate the crowds that came to see the holy relic. So the Mughal Governor at that time donated what was then called Sadiq Khan Bagh. This place became the present Hazratbal Shrine that has since then housed the holy relic. In 1886 Nawab of Dhaka Sir Khwaja Ahsanullah, whose ancestors were from Kashmir, sent money that was used for major renovation of the present building of the shrine.

The mystic never visited Kashmir but his followers made a Khankah in his name. In this Khankah, the corpse of Mohi-u-din, one of his descendants lies buried in the mausoleum. This mainly wooden shrine has some fine panels done in the pinjra-kari style. The urs of Naqshband Sahib is observed on the 3rd day of the Hijri month of Rabi-ul-Awwal. Naqshbandi silsila followers are all over the world and also in Kashmir Valley. Mostly in Safapora Manasbal, Kurhama Ganderbal, Bandipora, Srinagar, Pattan Baramulla and also in other districts.

== Gallery ==
Ziyarat Naqshband Sahab
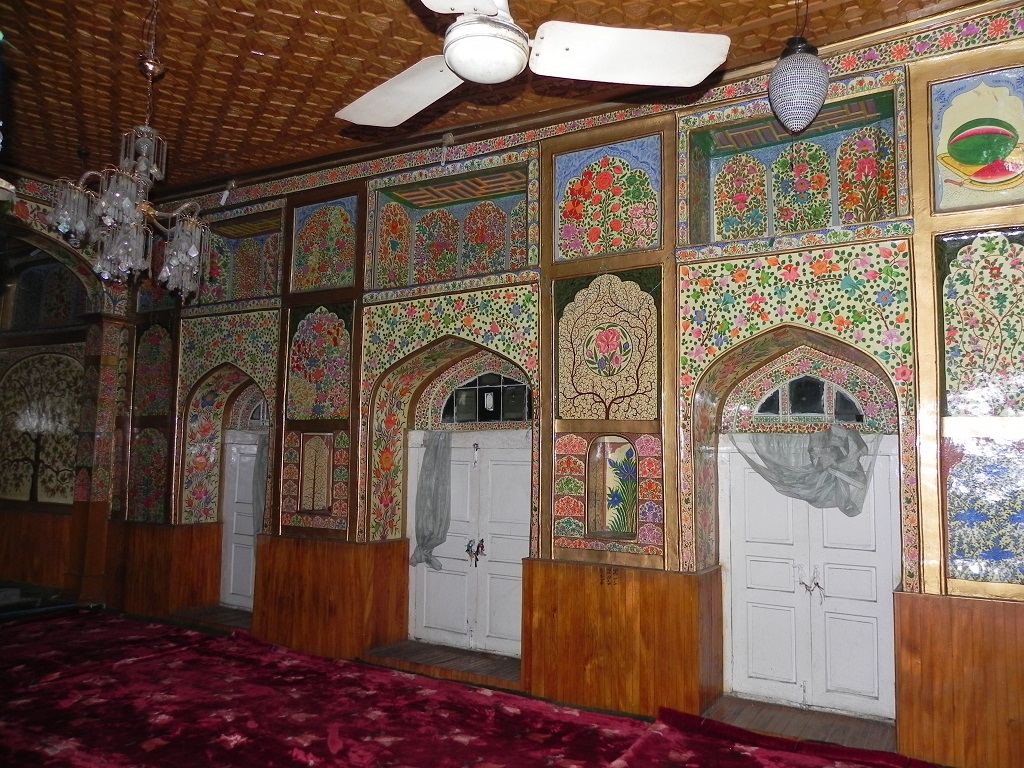
Papier-mâché work on the inside walls of the Shrine.

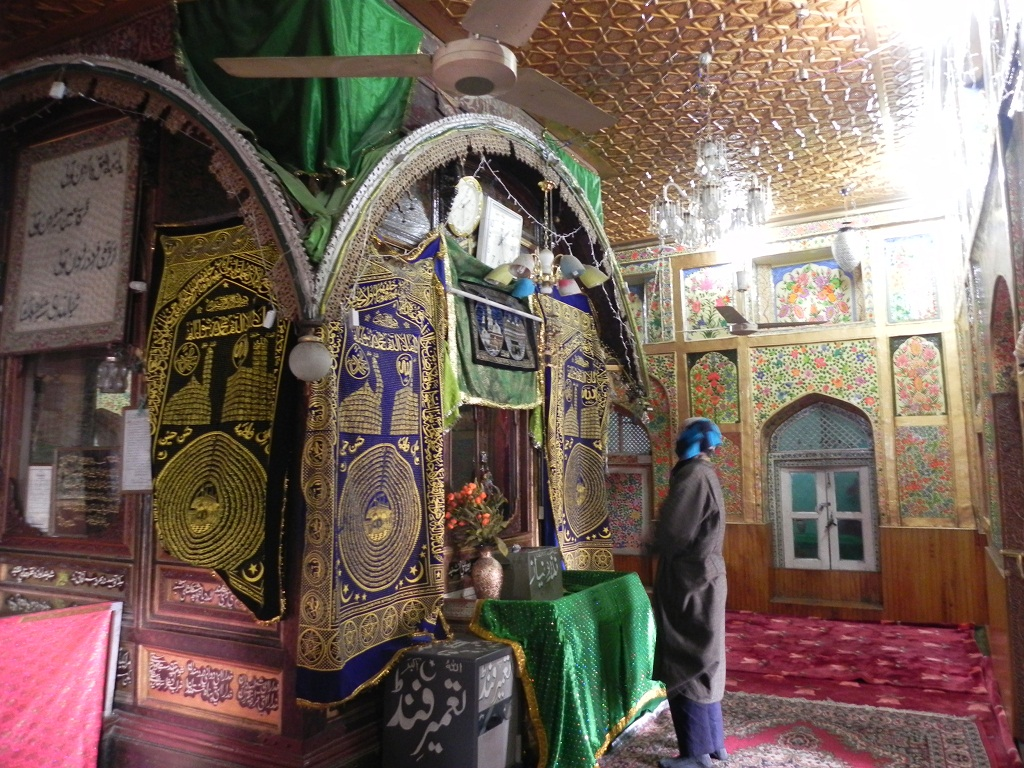
Devotee inside the shrine

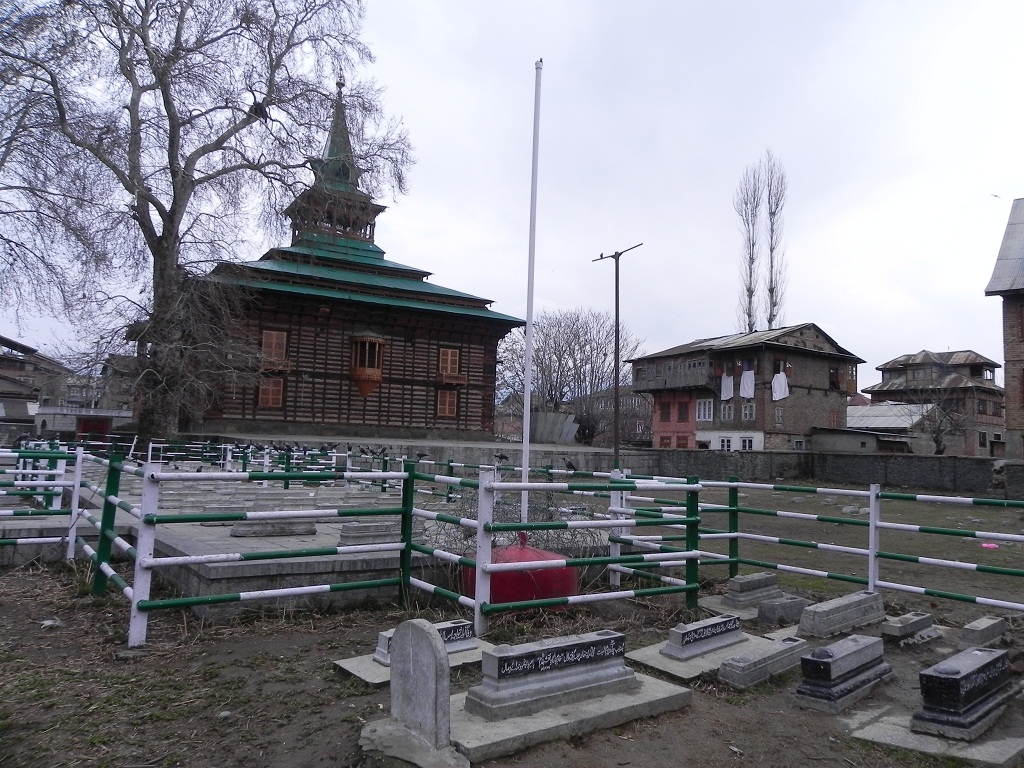
Graveyard of Martyr's 13 July 1931 known as Martyr's Graveyard

== See also ==
- Sayyid Bahauddin Naqshband
- Hazrat Ishaan
- Sayyid Mir Jan
