= Sayyid Mir Jan =

Sufi saint

Ghawth Sayyid Mir Jan Shah Saheb
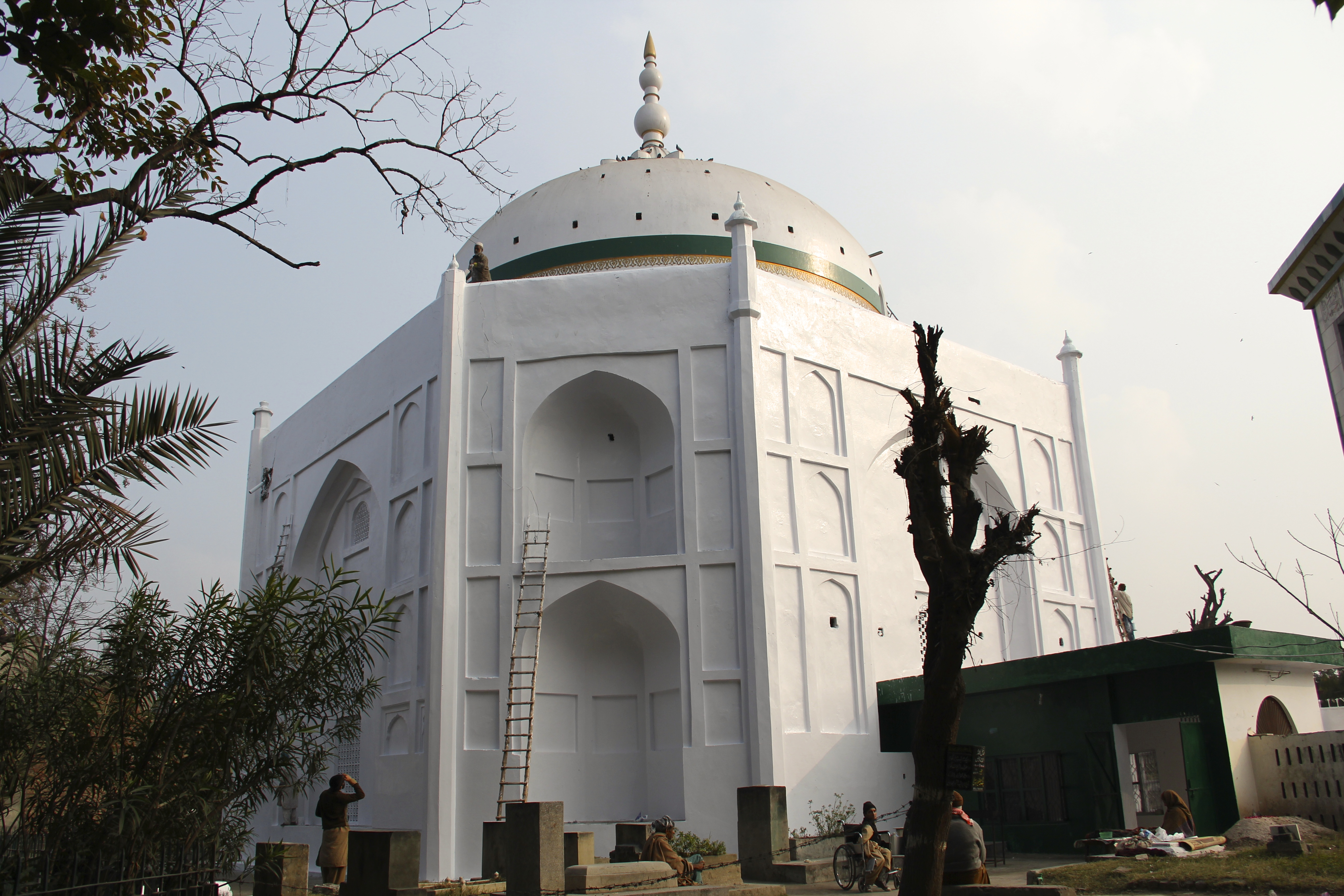

Personal life
- Born: 1800 Kabul
- Died: 19 April 1901 (aged 100–101) Lahore

Religious life
- Religion: Islam
- Denomination: Sunni
- Jurisprudence: Hanafi
- Tariqa: Naqshbandi; Sub-Tariqa Naqshbandi Ishaani
- Creed: Maturidi

Muslim leader
- Predecessor: Hazrat Ishaan
- Successor: Sayyid Mahmud Agha
- Influenced by: Hazrat Ishaan, Sayyid Moinuddin Hadi Naqshband Mir Sayyid Hasan bin Azimullah
- Influenced: Ahmad Raza Khan Barelvi, Sayyid Mahmud Agha

Ghawth Sayyid Mir Jan Shah Saheb ibn Hasan Naqshbandi Ishaani (Arabic: الغوث سيد مير جان شاه صاحب بن حسن النقشبندي الإيشاني) was a Sufi saint from Kabul and a 19th century leader of the Naqshbandi Ishaani Sub-Tariqa.

== Ancestry ==
Sayyid Mir Jan claimed to be a Sayyid (a descendant of Muhammad through his daughter Fatimah and his cousin Ali ibn Abi Talib), both maternally and paternally. His ancestors are claimed to have immigrated to Bukhara and after that to Kabul, where Sayyid Mir Jan was born. They also migrated to Bukhara, where the prominent Sufi saint Bahauddin Naqshband, founder of the Naqshbandi Sufi Order, was born. A descendant of Bahauddin Naqshband after 7 generations was Hazrat Ishaan, whose descendants later immigrated to variable regions of Central Asia, like Khorasan, today known as Afghanistan in order to spread the Naqshbandi Ishaani sub-order's teachings.

== Biography ==
=== Early life and education ===
Sayyid Mir Jan was introduced in Tasawwuf in the age of 5 years. His father Sayyid Mir Hasan was also a high ranking saint, who used to teach his sons about Islam and Sufism. Sayyid Mir Jan was educated in Kabul and became a professor of Islamic theology. Later he has built his own university in Lahore. Sayyid Mir Jan and his brother Sayyid Mahmud also wrote poems.

=== Spiritual journey ===
After his education in Kabul, Sayyid Mir Jan stayed in Medina for a decade to be trained by one of his masters, and while there married a local woman. Later, he traveled to Lahore to the tomb of Hazrat Khwaja Khawand Mahmud, also known as Hazrat Ishaan. Hazrat Ishaan was a Sufi saint from Bukhara, whose wilayat was also in Lahore. Hazrat Ishaan's successors included his two sons Moinuddin Naqshband in Srinagar, Kashmir and Bahauddin in Lahore and their descendants until the late 18th century, by which time the lineage was lost. According to a legend, Hazrat Ishaan made prophecies about Sayyid Mir Jan, naming him as his successor to revive his lineage. Sayyid Mir Jan was a Qutb, more commonly known as Ghawth, the highest ranking Wali (Saint) of his time.

== See also ==
- Abdul Qadir Jilani
- Ali Hujwiri
- Mir Sayyid Ali Hamadani
- Bahauddin Naqshband
- Moinuddin Chishti
- Hazrat Ishaan
- Ziyarat Naqshband Sahab
