= Naqshbandi Order =

Sufi mystic order in Sunni Islam

Naqshbandi order
- الطريقة النقشبندية al-Ṭarīqa al-Naqshbandīyya
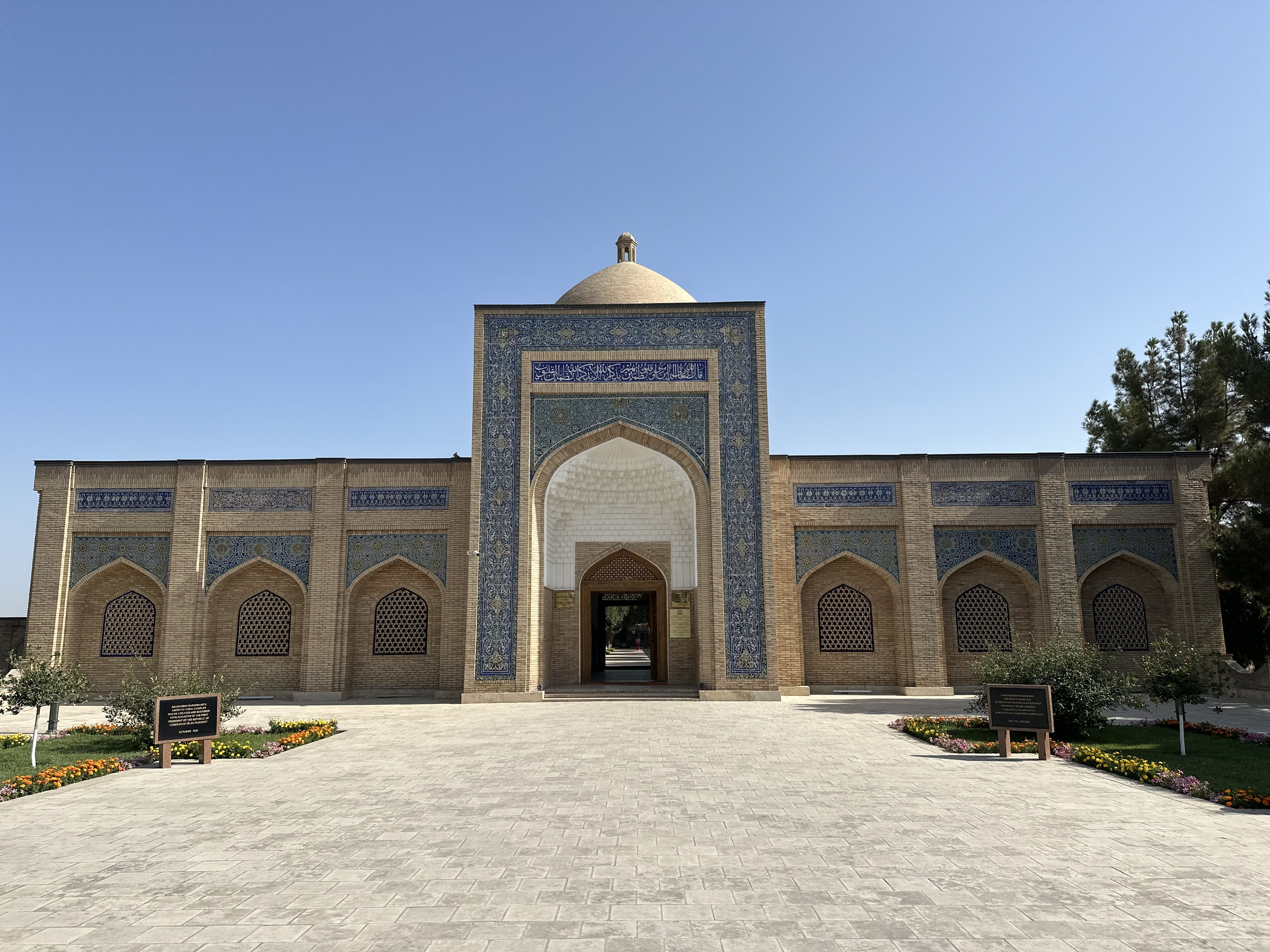
- Shrine of the order's founder Baha' al-Din Naqshband in Uzbekistan
- Abbreviation: Naqshbandīyya
- Type: Sufi order
- Classification: Sunni Islam
- Region: Central Asia, Indian sub-continent, Middle East
- Founder: Baha' al-Din Naqshband
- Origin: 14th century Timurid Empire

The Naqshbandi order (Persian: نقشبندیه) is a major Sufi order within Sunni Islam, named after its 14th-century founder, Baha' al-Din Naqshband. Practitioners, known as Naqshbandis, trace their spiritual lineage (silsila) directly to the Islamic prophet Muhammad through the first caliph, Abu Bakr, via Ja'far al-Sadiq. The Naqshbandi order is distinct for its strict adherence to Sharia (Islamic law) and silent dhikr practices adopted from earlier Central Asian masters.

== History ==
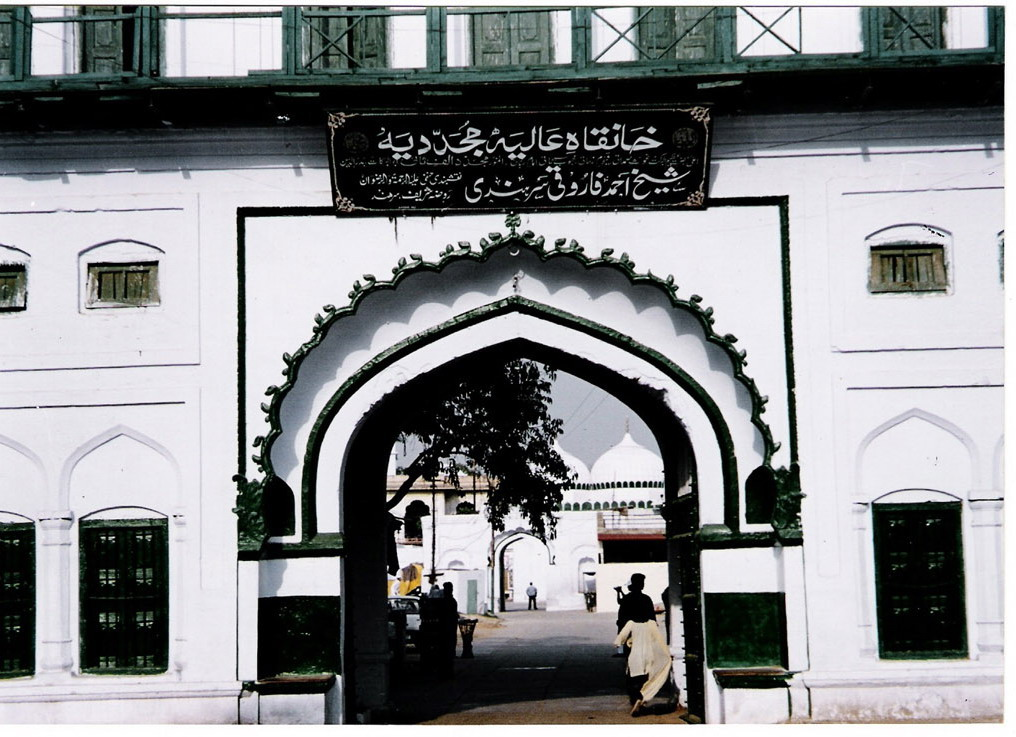
Mosque and tomb of Ahmad Sirhindi in Punjab, India, a prominent guide of the Naqshbandi Sufi order venerated as Imam Rabbani and Mujaddid Alf-Thani

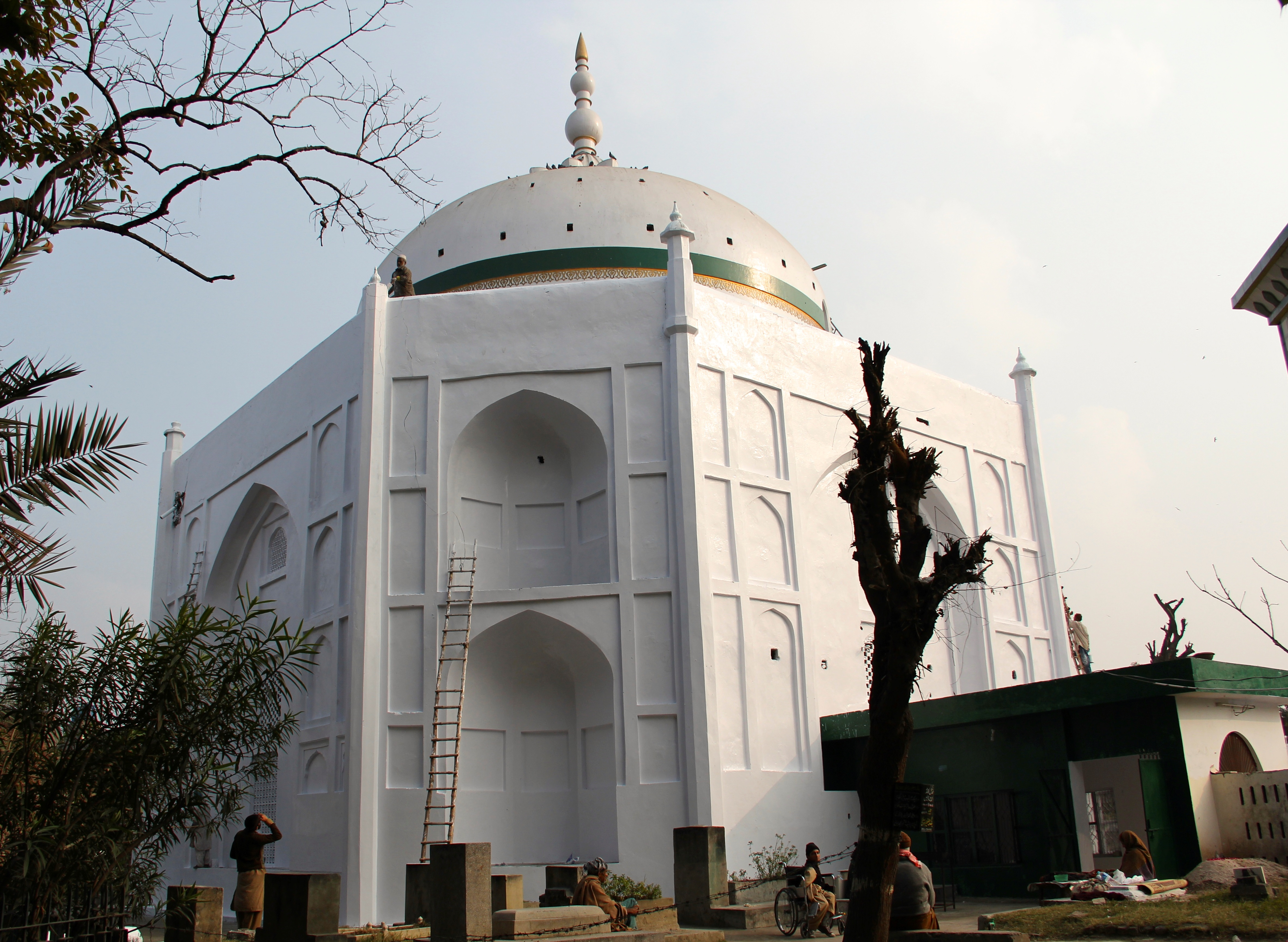
Shrine of Sayyid Mir Jan Naqshbandi in Lahore, Pakistan

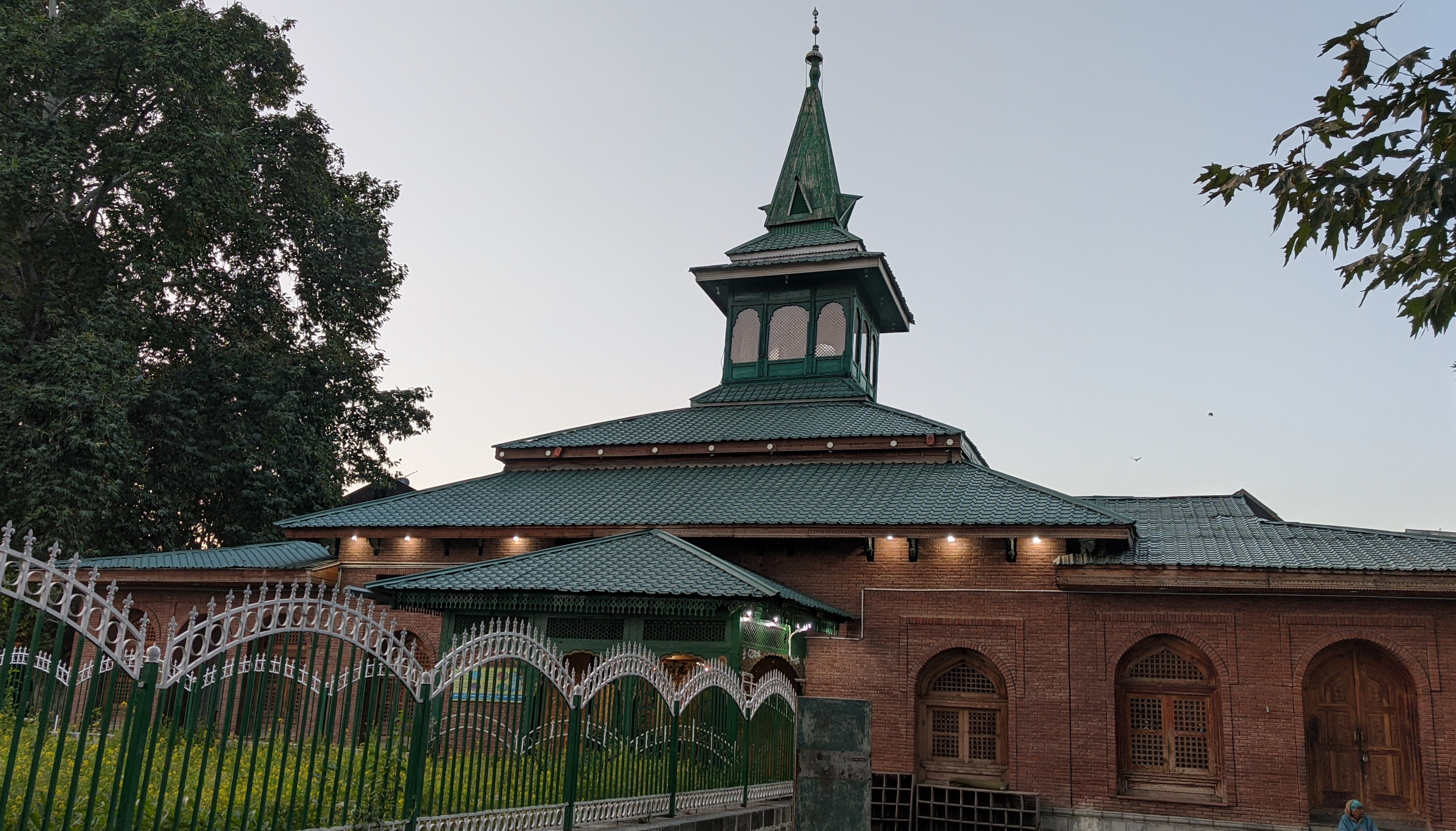
Shrine of Moinuddin Hadi Naqshband in Srinagar, Kashmir

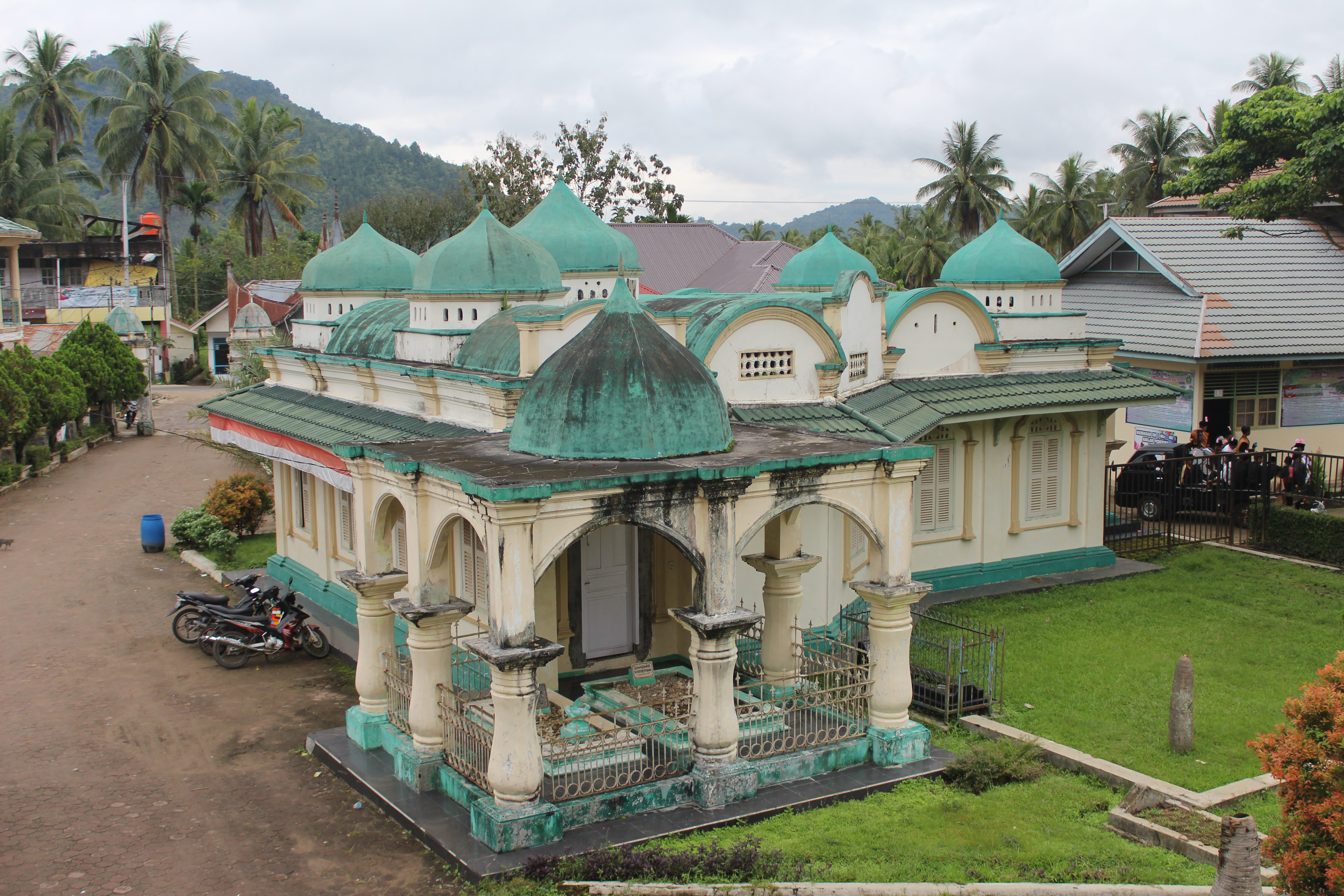
Tomb of Abdurrahman Batuhampar, a Naqshbandi sheikh in Sumatra and grandfather of Mohammad Hatta

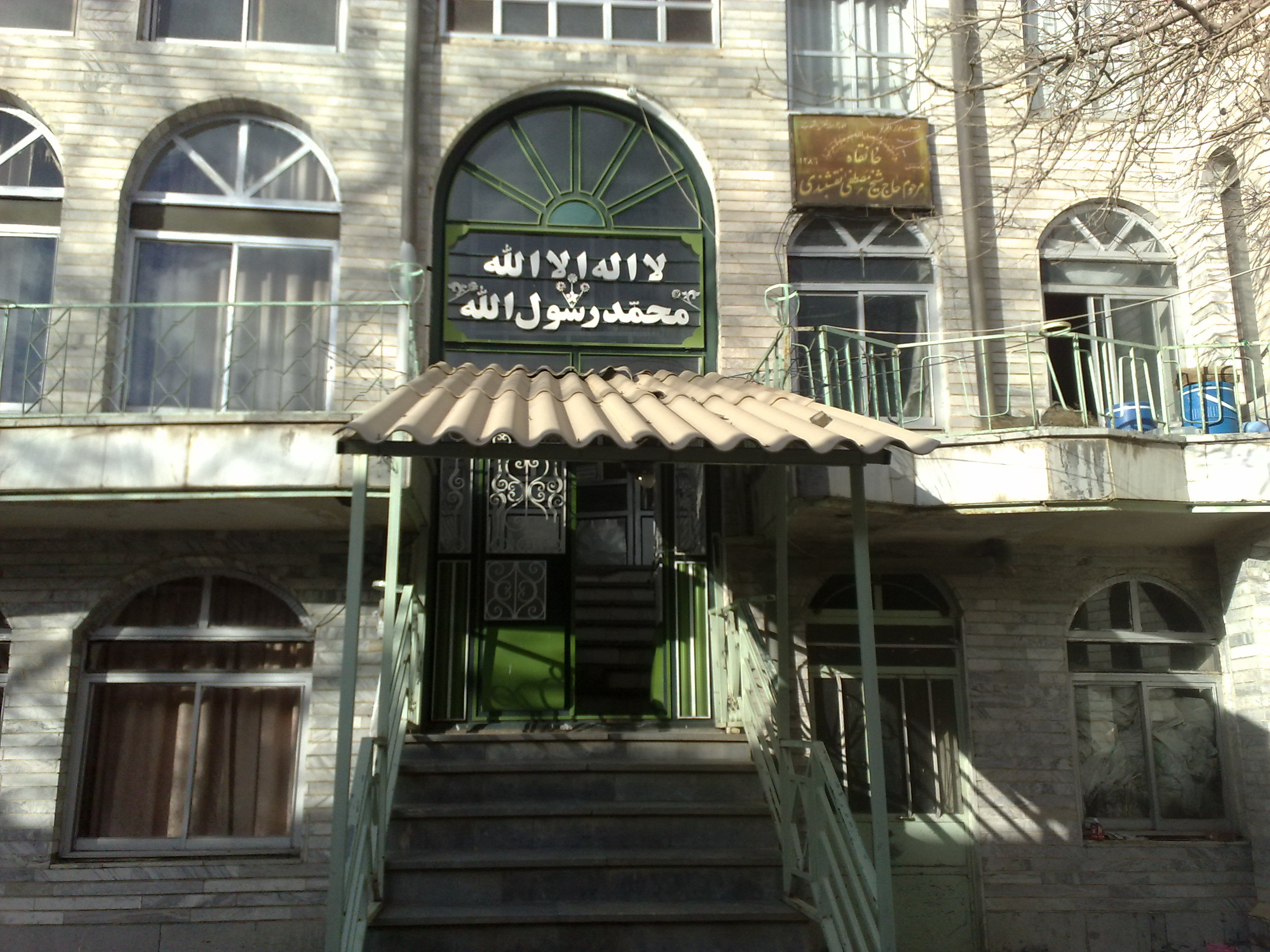
A Khanaqah (prayer house) of Naqshbandi in Saqqez's bazaar in Iran

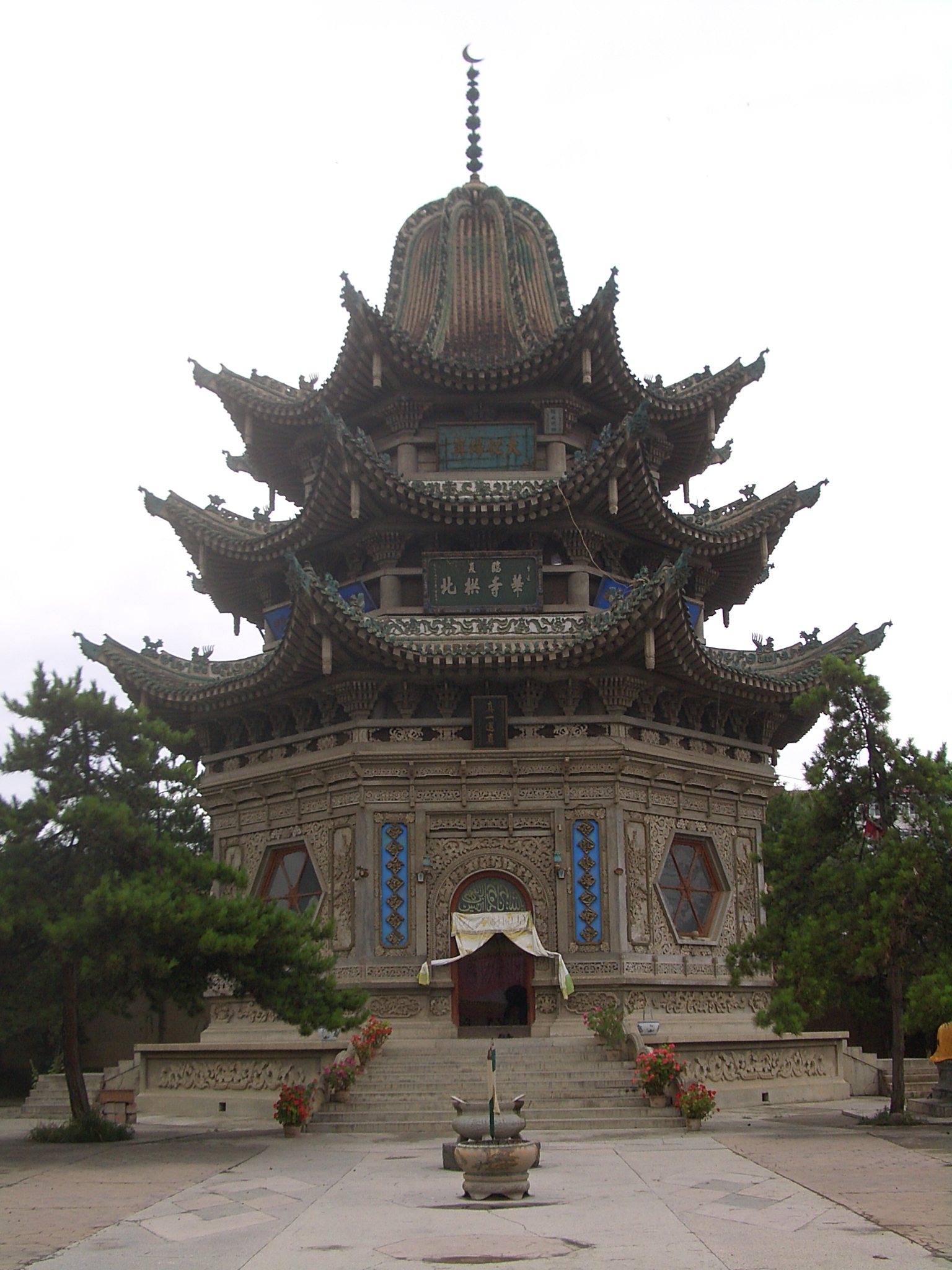
Ma Laichi's mausoleum (Hua Si Gongbei) in Linxia City, is the earliest and most important Naqshbandi monument in China

The order is also known as the "convergence of the two oceans" due to the presence of Abu Bakr and Jafar al-Sadiq in the silsila and the "Sufi Order of Jafar al-Sadiq". The Naqshbandi order owes many insights to Yusuf Hamadani and Abdul Khaliq Ghijduwani in the 12th century, the latter of whom is regarded as the organizer of the practices and is responsible for placing stress upon the purely silent remembrance of Allah. It was later associated with Baha al-Din Shah Naqshband in the 14th century, hence the name of the order.

Since it was founded the Naqshbandi order has split into multiple sub-orders founded by several prominent figures within the chain of succession. 'Ubeydullah Ahrar founded the Naqshbandiyya-Ahrariyya; Ahmad Sirhindi founded the Naqshbandiyya-Mujaddidiyya; Shamsuddin Mirza Mazhar founded the Naqshbandiyya-Mazhariyya; and Mawlana Khalid founded the Naqshbandiyya-Khalidiyya.

=== South Asia ===
The Naqshbandiyya order became an influential factor in Indian Muslim life, and for two centuries it was the most common Sufi order in the Indian subcontinent. Khwaja Baqi Billah, who was born in Kabul and brought up and educated in Kabul and Samarkand, is credited for bringing the order to India during the end of the 16th century. He tried to spread his knowledge about the order but died three years later. His disciple Ahmad Sirhindi took over after his death, and it was through him that the order gained popularity within a short period of time. Shah Waliullah Dehlawi was an 18th-century member of the order.

=== Uzbekistan ===
Baha' al-Din Naqshband was born in a village near Bukhara in present-day Uzbekistan, making the country the ancestral home of the Naqshbandi Sufi order. The order was developed primarily throughout Central Asia through alliances with local khanates and leading members becoming spiritual or religious adversaries to political figures. The order spearheaded resistance to Russian expansion into Central Asia in the 19th century and led an armed uprising against the Soviets between 1940 and 1942. Today, Naqshbandis are most prominent in the Ferghana Valley and large cities including Andijan, Kokand and Bukhara.

Whereas the USSR restricted the movement's activities as part of its official policy of atheism, the successor Uzbek government initially reopened and renovated Naqshband's mausoleum and encouraged mass pilgrimages. The first post-independence government of Islam Karimov displayed a varying attitude of tolerance and hostility during his rule (1991–2016). In contrast, his successor Shavkat Mirziyoyev has promoted Sufism in general and the Naqshbandi order in particular as essential components of Uzbek heritage and folklore, as part of a campaign to boost both Sufi pilgrim and general tourism. Some commentators have also seen the Uzbek government's recent promotion of Naqshbandis as a means to counter the domestic appeal of Islamism.

=== Iraq ===
The Naqshbandi order established roots in modern-day Iraq primarily through the efforts of the Kurdish Islamic scholar Mawlana Khalid in the early 19th century. The Baghdad-educated, polyglot Khalid was considered charismatic and built a persona to residents of Mesopotamian cities around Baghdad, legitimising Naqshbandi practices as part of Islamic life, by capitalising on local frustrations' to the Ottoman Empire's gradual decline against European powers. Khalid further tapped into existing Naqshbandi networks in the empire, especially in Anatolia and Syria, to generate positive public awareness of the order and win new adherents from the intellectual and academic elite. These new members of the order established lodges and fostering a sense of intellectual dynamism and pan-Muslim unity, elements that many local Muslims felt were lacking in other Sufi orders.

The order's growth in present-day northern Iraq and then in began between 1810 and 1920 was aided by its appeal to women through relatively egalitarian positions regarding their participation in Naqshbandi order rites. Prominent female supporters of the movement included wives of local political and wealthy financial supporters. The personalised influence of Khalid on the order in Iraq has led many scholars to label it as Khalidism and distinguish it from the more conventional Naqshbandism.

Since the US invasion of Iraq in 2003, some members have formed an armed opposition group to the American presence, the Army of the Men of the al-Naqshbandi Order, led by former Saddam Hussein-era Vice President Izzat al-Douri. Many observers considered this group's tactical alliance with Sunni Islamist armed groups, such as al-Qaeda and — later in 2014 with the Islamic State (ISIS) to capture Mosul — to be puzzling, given Sunni fundamentalists' strong doctrinal opposition to Sufi practices.

=== Turkey ===
The Naqshbandi order entered Anatolia during the Ottoman Empire, especially in the 15th and 16th centuries. It became particularly influential in the 18th and 19th centuries, often seen as a more orthodox alternative to the Mevlevi (Rumi followers) or Bektashi orders. After the fall of the Ottoman Empire, during Atatürk's secular reforms, Sufi lodges (tekkes) were banned in 1925. Despite this, the Naqshbandi order continued underground and remained influential, particularly where the new government's authority was less pronounced in Eastern Turkey. The order resurfaced in public life in the 1950s and 1960s, when the secularist government eased restrictions on religious practices.

=== Syria ===
The Naqshbandi order was introduced into Syria at the end of the 17th century by Murad Ali al-Bukhari, who established himself in Damascus and traveled throughout Arabia. His branch became known as the Muradiyya and was led by his descendants. In 1820, Khalid Shahrazuri rose as a prominent Naqshbandi leader in the Ottoman world and his order became known as the Khalidiyya which spread for at least two decades. In Syria and Lebanon, the leaders of every active Naqshbandiyya group acknowledged its spiritual lineage. Later, a strife between Khalid's khalifas led to disruption of the order and it divide. The Farmadiyya branch, which practices silent and vocal invocation, is still present in Lebanon and is named after Ali-Farmadi. The pre-Mujaddidi line of the Naqshbandiyya in Greater Syria came to an end when political leader Musa Bukhar died in 1973. The only branch to have survived till recently is the one based in the Khanqah al-Uzbakiyya in Jerusalem.

=== Egypt ===
The Naqshbandi order rose to prominence in Egypt during the 19th century. A major khanqah was constructed in 1851 by Abbas I as a favor to the Naqshbandi sheikh Ahmad Ashiq, who led the order until his death in 1883. Ahmad Ashiq practiced the Diya'iyya branch of the Khalidiyya. Two other versions of Naqshbandiyya spread in Egypt in the last decades of the 19th century: the Judiyya, led by sheikh Juda Ibrahim, and the Khalidiyya, led by Sudanese al-Sharif Isma'il al-Sinnari and his successors. These branches continued to grow and are still active today. None of the early orders survived far into the 20th century however, and all khanqahs in Egypt were closed in 1954 when the buildings were either assigned a different function or demolished.

=== Southeast Asia ===
The first known Naqshbandi murshid in Malay Archipelago was Yusuf al-Makassari, a 17th century Islamic scholar who also introduced Khalwatiyya to the region. However, the order quickly disappeared before being introduced again in the 19th century. There are two well known branches of Naqshbandiyya in Southeast Asia. The first one is Khalidiyya, introduced by Ismail al-Minankabawi, a disciple of Abdullah al-Arzinjani in Mecca, and spread across Sumatra, Java, and Malay Peninsula. PERTI, an Indonesian Islamic organization from Minangkabau Highlands, was founded by Sulaiman ar-Rasuli and other Khalidi clerics. The other branch is Mazhariyya, named after Shamsuddin Mazhar, a Naqshbandi branch through Abu Said al-Ahmadi, one of Abdullah Dehlawi's khalifas. Mazhariyya is the main Naqshbandi branch in Madura, brought by Abdul Azim al-Maduri after studying in Mecca. Another related order is Qadiriyya wa Naqshbandiyya, a fusion of Qadiriyya and Naqshbandiyya, whose sheikhs in Banten and Lombok led rebellions against the Dutch East Indies at the end of the 19th century.

=== China ===
Ma Laichi brought the Naqshbandi (نقشبندية) 納克什班迪 order to China, creating the Khufiyya (خفيه) 虎夫耶 Hua Si Sufi 华寺; ("Multicolored Mosque") menhuan. Ma Mingxin, also brought the Naqshbandi order, creating the Jahriyya (جهرية) 哲赫林耶 menhuan. These two menhuan were rivals, and fought against each other which led to the Jahriyya Rebellion, Dungan revolt, and Dungan Revolt (1895).

== Teachings and practices ==
Naqshbandi teachings center on the "Eleven Principles," combining silent dhikr with daily mindfulness. These include inward awareness, watchfulness over thoughts, and conscious breathing.

The order highlights strict observance of the Sharia and introduces silent inward dhikr, distinguishing it from vocal chanting practices prevalent in other Sufi tariqas.

== Prominent figures ==
- Abdul Khaliq Ghijduwani (d. 1179)
- Baha al-Din Shah Naqshband (1318–1389)
- Khwaja Ahrar (1404-1490)
- Ahmad Sirhindi (1564–1624)
- Hazrat Ishaan (1563-1642)
- Shah Waliullah Dehlawi (1703–1762)
- Mawlana Khalid (1779–1827)
- Uthman Sirâj-ud-Dîn Naqshbandi (1781-1867)
- Sayyid Mir Jan (1800-1901)
- Shah Akbar Danapuri (1844-1914)
- Khawaja Qasim Sadiq Mohrvi (1845-1943)
- Khwaja Yunus Ali (1886-1951)
- Süleyman Hilmi Tunahan (1888-1959)
- Muhamamad Uthman Sirâj-ud-Dîn Naqshbandi (1896–1997)
- Mahmud Esad Coşan (1938-2001)
- Nazim al-Haqqani (1922-2014)
- Shaykh Hisham Kabbani

== Principal teachings ==
The Naqshbandi order has 11 principle teachings known as the Eleven Naqshbandi principles. The first eight were formulated by Abdul Khaliq Ghijduwani, and the last three were added by Baha-ud-Din Shah Naqshband.

1. Remembrance (Yād-kard – Persian: یاد کرد): Always orally and mentally repeating the dhikr.
2. Restraint (Bāz-gasht – Persian: بازگشت): Focus on Tawhid, and engaging in the dhikr of the shahada phrase – "La-ilaha il-allah".
3. Watchfulness (Negāh-dāsht – Persian: نگاه داشت): Being conscientious over wandering thoughts.
4. Recollection (Yād-dāsht – Persian: ياد داشت): Concentration upon the Divine presence in a condition of dhawq, foretaste, intuitive anticipation or perceptiveness, not using external aids.
5. Awareness while breathing (Housh dar dam – Persian: هوش در دم): Controlling one's breathing by not exhaling or inhaling in the forgetfulness of the Divine.
6. Journeying in one's homeland (Safar dar watan - Persian: سفر در وطن): An internal journey that moves the person from having blameworthy to praiseworthy properties. This is also referred to as the vision or revelation of the hidden side of the shahada.
7. Watching one's step (Nazar bar qadam - Persian: نظر بر قدم): Do not be distracted from purpose of the ultimate journey.
8. Solitude in a crowd (Khalwat dar anjuman - Persian: خلوت در انجمن): Although journey is outwardly in this world, it is inwardly with God.
9. Temporal pause (Wuquf-i zamāni - Persian: وقوف زمانی): Keeping account of how one spends his or her time. If time is spent rightfully give thanks and time is spent incorrectly ask for forgiveness.
10. Numerical pause (Wuquf-i adadi - Persian: وقوف عددی): Checking that the dhikr has been repeated in odd numbers.
11. Heart pause (Wuquf-i qalbi - Persian: وقوف قلبی): Forming a mental picture of one's heart with the name of God engraved to emphasize that the heart has no consciousness or goal other than God.
