= Islam during the Qing dynasty =

Overview of the role of Islam and Muslims in Qing dynasty China

During the Manchu-led Qing dynasty (1644–1912), Islam was a significant religion in Northwestern China and Yunnan. There were five major Muslim rebellions during the Qing period. The first and last rebellions were caused by sectarian infighting between rival Sufi Muslim orders.

== History ==
=== Anti-Qing rebellions ===
==== Ming loyalist Muslims ====
After the Qing dynasty's capture of the Ming dynasty capital in 1644, Muslim Ming loyalists in Gansu led by Muslim leaders Milayin and Ding Guodong led a revolt in 1646 against the Qing during the Milayin rebellion in order to drive the Qing out and restore the Ming Prince of Yanchang Zhu Sichuan to the throne as the emperor. The Muslim Ming loyalists were supported by Hami's Sultan Sa'id Baba and his son Prince Turumtay. The Muslim Ming loyalists were joined by Tibetan and Han peoples in the revolt. After fierce fighting, and negotiations, a peace agreement was agreed on in 1649, and Milayan and Ding nominally pledged allegiance to the Qing and were given ranks as members of the Qing military. When other Ming loyalists in southern China made a resurgence and the Qing were forced to withdraw their forces from Gansu to fight them, Milayan and Ding once again took up arms and rebelled against the Qing. The Muslim Ming loyalists were then crushed by the Qing with 100,000 of them, including Milayin, Ding Guodong, and Turumtay killed in battle.

The Confucian Hui Muslim scholar Ma Zhu (1640–1710) served with the southern Ming loyalists against the Qing. Zhu Yu'ai, the Ming Prince Gui was accompanied by Hui refugees when he fled from Huguang to the Burmese border in Yunnan and as a mark of their defiance against the Qing and loyalty to the Ming, they changed their surname to Ming.

==== Early revolts in Xinjiang, Shaanxi and Gansu ====
The Kangxi Emperor incited anti-Muslim sentiment among the Mongols of Qinghai (Kokonor) in order to gain support against the Dzungar Oirat Mongol leader Galdan. Kangxi claimed that Chinese Muslims inside China such as Turkic Muslims in Qinghai (Kokonor) were plotting with Galdan, who he falsely claimed converted to Islam. Kangxi falsely claimed that Galdan had spurned and turned his back on Buddhism and the Dalai Lama and that he was plotting to install a Muslim as ruler of China after invading it in a conspiracy with Chinese Muslims. Kangxi also distrusted Muslims of Turfan and Hami.

From 1755–1757, the Qianlong Emperor was at war with the Dzungar Khanate in the northwest. With the conquest of the Dzungaria, there was attempt to divide the Xinjiang region into four sub-khanates under four chiefs who were subordinate to the emperor. Similarly, the Qing made members of was a member of the Ak Taghliq clan of East Turkestan Khojas, rulers in the western Tarim Basin, south of the Tianshan Mountains. In 1758–59, however, rebellions against this arrangement broke out both north and south of the Tian Shan mountains. Then in the oasis of Ush to the south of Lake Balkash in 1765.

The Ush rebellion in 1765 by Uyghurs against the Manchus occurred after Uyghur women were gang raped by the servants and son of Manchu official Su-cheng. It was said that Ush Muslims had long wanted to sleep on [Sucheng and son's] hides and eat their flesh. because of the rape of Uyghur Muslim women for months by the Manchu official Sucheng and his son. The Manchu Emperor ordered that the Uyghur rebel town be massacred, the Qing forces enslaved all the Uyghur children and women and slaughtered the Uyghur men. Manchu soldiers and Manchu officials regularly having sex with or raping Uyghur women caused massive hatred and anger by Uyghur Muslims to Manchu rule. The invasion by Jahangir Khoja was preceded by another Manchu official, Binjing who raped a Muslim daughter of the Kokan aqsaqal from 1818 to 1820. The Qing sought to cover up the rape of Uyghur women by Manchus to prevent anger against their rule from spreading among the Uyghurs.

Professor of Chinese and Central Asian History at Georgetown University, James A. Millward wrote that foreigners often mistakenly think that Ürümqi was originally a Uyghur city and that the Chinese destroyed its Uyghur character and culture, however, Ürümqi was founded as a Chinese city by Han and Hui (Tungans), and it is the Uyghurs who are new to the city.

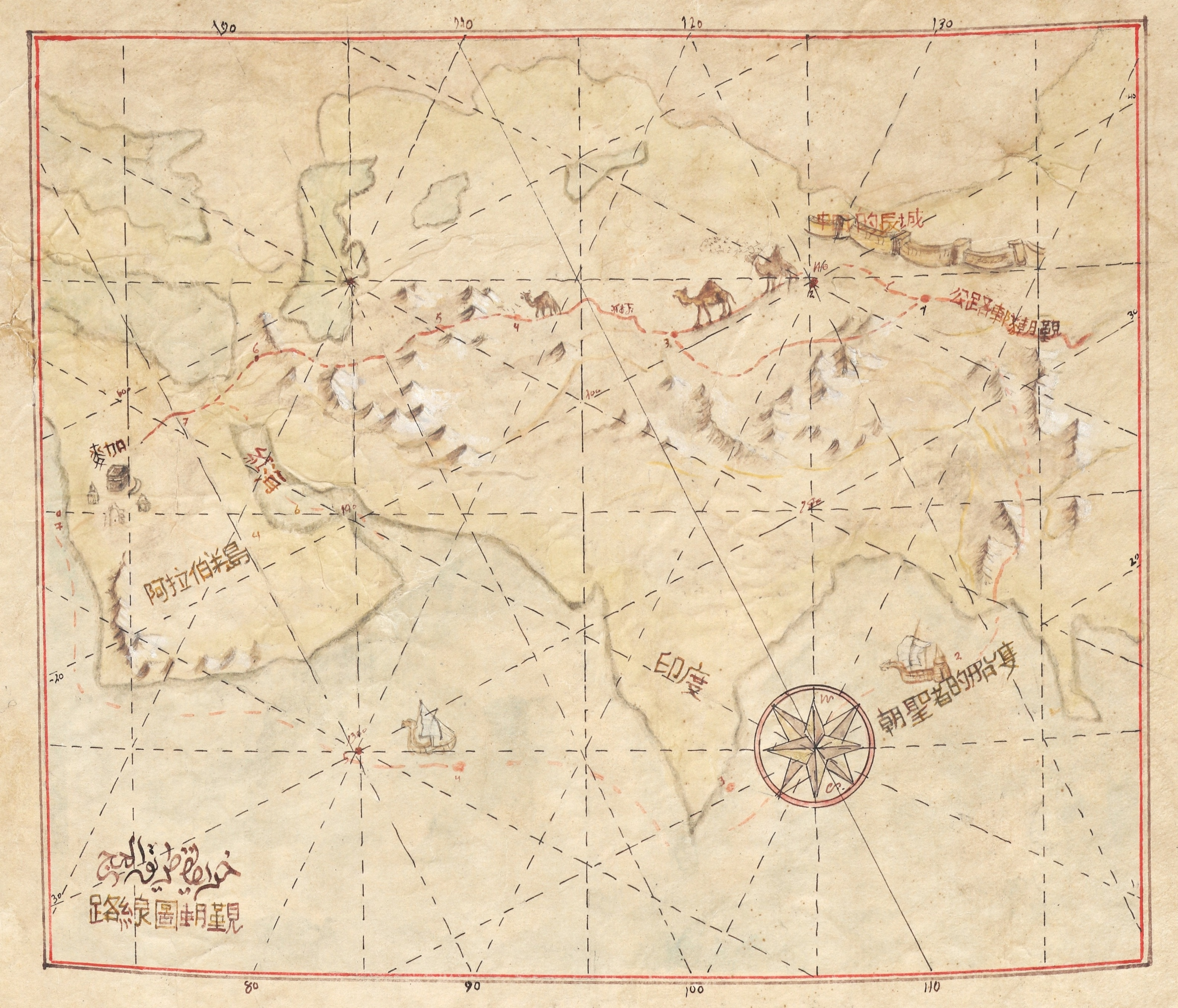
Late 19th century map of Hajj pilgrimage routes, by land and by sea, from China to Mecca.

In Gansu, disagreements between the adherents of Khafiya and Jahriya, two forms of Sufism as well as perceived mismanagement, corruption, and anti-Muslim attitudes of the Qing officials resulted in attempted uprisings by Hui and Salar followers of the Jahriya in 1781 and 1784, but they were easily and promptly suppressed, with the help of the Khafiya. Han, Hui, and Dongxiang joined the Salar Jahriyya in the 1781 revolt against the Qing.

In the Jahriyya revolt sectarian violence between two suborders of the Naqshbandi Sufis, the Jahriyya Sufi Muslims and their rivals, the Khafiyya Sufi Muslims, led to a Jahriyya Sufi Muslim rebellion which the Qing dynasty in China crushed with the help of the Khafiyya Sufi Muslims.

More than 1000 Hui Muslim children and women from the Sufi Jahriya order in eastern Gansu were massacred by Qing Banner general Li Shiyao during a 1784 uprising by Hui Jahriyya Muslims Zhang Wenqing and Tian Wu, 3 years after an early 1781 rebellion by Salar Sufi Jahriyya members when the Qing executed Jahriya leader Ma Mingxin. The Qing government under Qianlong then ordered the extermination of the Sufi Jahriya "New Teaching" and banned adoption of non-Muslim children by Muslims, converting non-Muslims to Muslim and banning new mosques from being built. Some Sufi Khafiya "Old Teaching" Muslims still served in Qing forces in fighting against the Jahriya Sufi "New Teaching" Muslims despite the fact that those laws forbidding them from spreading their religion applied to them too. Li Shiyao was a member of the Qing Eight Banners and related to the Qing royal family.

Kashgaria was able to be free of Qing control during an invasion by Jahangir Khoja who had invaded from Kokand, which lasted from 1820–1828. The oases of Kashgar and Yarkand were not recaptured by the Qing until 1828, after a three-year campaign. Hui Muslim merchants helped the Qing fight off Jahangir Khoja and his Turkic Kokandi invaders. The Uyghur Muslim Sayyid and Naqshbandi Sufi rebel of the Afaqi suborder, Jahangir Khoja was sliced to death (Lingchi) in 1828 by the Manchus for leading a rebellion against the Qing. In Kashgaria, this was followed by another invasion in 1829 by Mahommed Ali Khan and Yusuf Khoja, the brother of Jahangir. In 1846, a new Khoja revolt in Kashgar under Kath Tora led to his accession to rulership of Kashgar as an authoritarian ruler. His reign, however, was brief, for at the end of seventy-five days, on the approach of the Chinese, he fled back to Kokand amid the jeers of the inhabitants.

The last of the Khoja revolts was in 1857 under Wali Khan, a self-indulgent debaucherer, and the murderer of the famous German explorer, Adolf Schlagintweit. Wali Khan had invaded Kashgar from his base in Kokand, capturing Kashgar. Aside from his execution of Adolf Schlagintweit, his cruelty found many other reflections in the local legends. It is said that he killed so many innocent Muslims that four or six minarets were built from the skulls of the victims (kala minara); or that once, when an artisan made a sabre for him, he tested the weapon by cutting off the artisan's son head, who came with his father and was standing nearby, after that with words " it's a really good sabre " he presented artisan with a gift. This reign of tyranny did not make Kashgarians miss the Khoja too much when he was defeated by Qing troops after ruling the city for four months and forced to flee back to Kokand.

The local Muslims living under Yaqub Beg's rule in Kashgaria after he took over the area from the Qing, found the conditions under Yaqub Beg to be oppressive and recalled Qing rule favorably and in a positive manner.

==== Panthay Rebellion ====
The Panthay Rebellion lasted from 1855 to 1873. The war took place mostly in the southwestern province of Yunnan. Disagreements between Muslim and non-Muslim tin miners was the spark that lit the tensions that led to war. The Muslims were led by, for the most part of the war, by Du Wenxiu (1823–1872), a Muslim from a family of Han Chinese origin which had converted to Islam. Du Wenxiu raised the banner of his revolt in the name of driving the Manchus out of China and establishing unity between Han and Hui. The insurgents took the city of Dali and declared the new nation of Pingnan Guo, meaning “the Pacified Southern Nation”. The rebellion found support among China's aboriginal population and Burma.

The Manchu official Shuxing'a started an anti-Muslim massacre which led to the Panthay Rebellion. Shuxing'a developed a deep hatred of Muslims after an incident where he was stripped naked and nearly lynched by a mob of Muslims. He ordered several Muslim rebels to be slow sliced to death. Tariq Ali wrote about the real incident in one of his novels, claiming the Muslims who had nearly lynched Shuxing'a were not Hui Muslims but belonged to another ethnicity but nevertheless the Manchu official blamed all Muslims for the incident.

=== Dungan Revolt ===
The Dungan Revolt by the Hui from the provinces of Shaanxi, Gansu, Ningxia and Xinjiang, broke out due to a pricing dispute over bamboo poles which a Han merchant was selling to a Hui. It lasted from 1862 to 1877. The failure of the revolt led to the flight of many Dungan people into Imperial Russia.

==== Rebellions ====
During the mid-nineteenth century, the Muslims revolted against the Qing dynasty, most notably in the Dungan Revolt (1862–1877) and the Panthay rebellion 1856–1873) in Yunnan. One million people died in the Panthay rebellion, and several million died in the Dungan Revolt

However, Muslims in other parts of China proper like in the east and southern provinces who did not revolt, were not affected at all by the rebellion, and experienced no genocide, nor did they seek to revolt. It was reported that Muslim villages in Henan province, which was next to Shaanxi, were totally unaffected and relations between Han and Hui continued normally. The Hui Muslim population of Beijing was unaffected by the Muslim rebels during the Dungan Revolt.

Elisabeth Allès wrote that the relationship between Hui Muslim and Han peoples continued normally in the Henan area, with no ramifications or consequences from the Muslim rebellions of other areas. Allès wrote in the document "Notes on some joking relationships between Hui and Han villages in Henan" published by French Centre for Research on Contemporary China that "The major Muslim revolts in the middle of the nineteenth century which involved the Hui in Shaanxi, Gansu and Yunnan, as well as the Uyghurs in Xinjiang, do not seem to have had any direct effect on this region of the central plain."

Many Muslims like Ma Zhan'ao, Ma Anliang, Dong Fuxiang, Ma Qianling, and Ma Julung defected to the Qing dynasty side, and helped the Qing general Zuo Zongtang exterminate the Muslim rebels. These Muslim generals belonged to the Khafiya sect, and they helped Qing massacre Jahariyya rebels. General Zuo moved the Han around Hezhou out of the area and relocated them as a reward for the Muslims there helping Qing kill other Muslim rebels.

These pro-Qing Hui warlords rose to power by their fighting against Muslim rebels. The sons of the defected Muslim warlords of the Dungan Revolt (1862–1877) helped the Qing crush the Muslim rebels in the Dungan Revolt (1895–1896).

In 1895, another Dungan Revolt broke out, and loyalist Muslims like Dong Fuxiang, Ma Anliang, Ma Guoliang, Ma Fulu, and Ma Fuxiang suppressed and massacred the rebel Muslims led by Ma Dahan, Ma Yonglin, and Ma Wanfu. The 1895 revolt was similar to the 1781 Jahriyya revolt in that it began with fighting between different Muslim factions, and that they had tried to resolve the dispute between the factions through the legal system of China before turning to violence.

A Muslim army called the Kansu Braves led by General Dong Fuxiang fought for the Qing dynasty against the foreigners during the Boxer Rebellion. They included well known Generals like Ma Anliang, Ma Fulu, and Ma Fuxiang.

In Yunnan the Qing armies only massacred the Muslims who had rebelled, and spared Muslims who took no part in the uprising.

In addition to sending Han exiles convicted of crimes to Xinjiang to be slaves of Banner garrisons there, the Qing also practiced reverse exile, exiling Inner Asian (Mongol, Russian and Muslim criminals from Mongolia and Inner Asia) to China proper where they would serve as slaves in Han Banner garrisons in Guangzhou. Russian, Oirats and Muslims (Oros. Ulet. Hoise jergi weilengge niyalma) such as Yakov and Dmitri were exiled to the Han banner garrison in Guangzhou. In the 1780s after the Muslim rebellion in Gansu started by Zhang Wenqing 張文慶 was defeated, Muslims like Ma Jinlu 馬進祿 were exiled to the Han Banner garrison in Guangzhou to become slaves to Han Banner officers. The Qing code regulating Mongols in Mongolia sentenced Mongol criminals to exile and to become slaves to Han bannermen in Han Banner garrisons in China proper.

The Hui Muslim community was divided in its support for the 1911 Xinhai Revolution. The Hui Muslims of Shaanxi supported the revolutionaries and the Hui Muslims of Gansu supported the Qing. The native Hui Muslims of Xi'an (Shaanxi province) joined the Han Chinese revolutionaries in slaughtering the entire 20,000 Manchu population of Xi'an. The native Hui Muslims of Gansu province led by general Ma Anliang sided with the Qing and prepared to attack the anti-Qing revolutionaries of Xi'an city. Only some wealthy Manchus who were ransomed and Manchu females survived. Wealthy Han Chinese seized Manchu girls to become their slaves and poor Han Chinese troops seized young Manchu women to be their wives. Young pretty Manchu girls were also seized by Hui Muslims of Xi'an during the massacre and brought up as Muslims.

== Culture ==
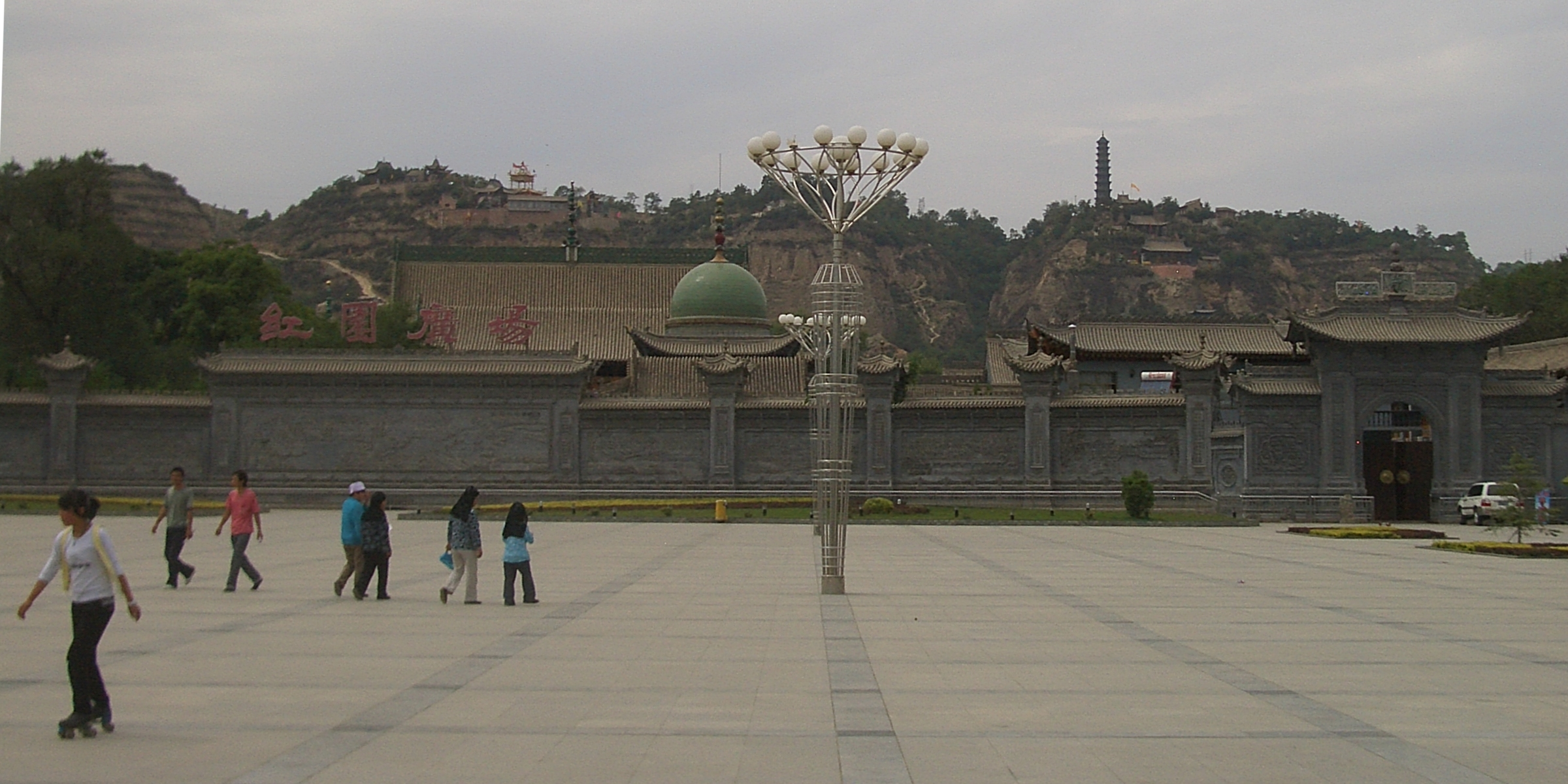
The dome of Qi Jingyi's Gongbei (shrine) seen over the wall of Hongyuan Park in Linxia

In the Qing dynasty, Muslims had many mosques in the large cities, with particularly important ones in Beijing, Xi'an, Hangzhou, Guangzhou, and other places (in addition to those in the western Muslim regions). The architecture typically employed traditional Chinese styles, with Arabic-language inscriptions being the chief distinguishing feature. Many Muslims held government positions, including positions of importance, particularly in the army.

The Qing treated Han and Hui civilians in the same legal category. Both Han and Hui were moved from the walled city in Beijing to the outside, while only Bannermen could reside inside the walled city.

The origin of Hui in Ürümqi is often indicated by the names of their Mosques.

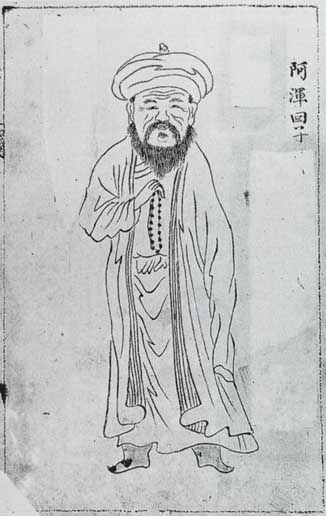
Painting depicting a Chinese Muslim, during the reign of the Qing dynasty.

Sufism spread throughout the Northwestern China in the early decades of the Qing dynasty (mid-17th century through early 18th century), helped by somewhat easier travel between China and the Middle East. Among the Sufi orders found in China are the Kubrawiyya, Naqshbandiyya, and Qadiriyya. The Naqshbandiyya spread to China via Yemen and Central Asia. Most Islamic proselytization activity occurred within the Muslim community itself between different sects and was not directed at non-Muslims, proselytizers who sought to convert other Muslims included people like Qi Jingyi, Ma Mingxin, Ma Qixi, and Ma Laichi. Some Sufi orders wear distinctive headgear, a six cornered hat can be found in China. The most important Sufi orders (menhuan) included:

- The Qadiriyya, which was established in China through Qi Jingyi (祁静一), also known as Hilal al-Din (1656–1719), student of the famous Central Asian Sufi teachers, Khoja Afaq and Koja Abd Alla. He was known among the Hui Sufis as Qi Daozu (Grand Master Qi). The shrine complex around "great tomb" (Da Gongbei) in Linxia remains the center of the Qadiriyya in China.
- The Khufiyya: a Naqshbandi order, established in China by Ma Laichi (1681–1766).
- The Jahriyya: another Naqshbandi menhuan, founded by Ma Mingxin (1719–1781).

Chinese Hui Sufis developed a new type of organization called the menhuan, centered around a lineage of Sufi masters.

The Hui Muslim scholar Liu Zhi wrote about Sufism in Chinese and translated Sufi writings from their original languages. The Hui Muslim scholar Wang Daiyu used Confucian, Daoist, and Buddhist terminology in his Islamic writings. Liu Zhi and Wang Daiyu were both Gedimu (non-Sufi) Muslims and argued that Muslims could be loyal both to the Mandate of Heaven and Allah, justifying Muslim obedience to the Qing government, since Allah was reflected by the Mandate of Haven in this world. Liu Zhi and Wang Daiyu's writings became part of the Han Kitab, a Chinese Islamic text which synthesized Islam and Confucianism, using Confucian terminology to explain Islam. Liu Zhi met and talked with the Vice Minister of the Board of War regarding Islam, convincing him that Confucian principles were supported by Islam so that it should not be regarded as heretical. Liu Zhi used neo-Confucianism in his Islamic work titled as "The Philosophy of Arabia", and it was written that the book "illuminates" Confucianism, while Confucianism was at odds with Buddhism and Taoism, in a preface to the book by the non-Muslim Vice-Minister of the Board of Propriety.

== Migrations ==
The Chin Haw are a group of Chinese immigrants who arrived in Thailand via Burma or Laos. Most of them were from Yunnan and about a third were Muslim.

In the 19th century, Chinese Muslims also became some of the first Muslims in New Zealand (See Islam in New Zealand). They came as golddiggers to work in the Dunstan gold fields in Otago in 1868.

== Christian missionary activities ==
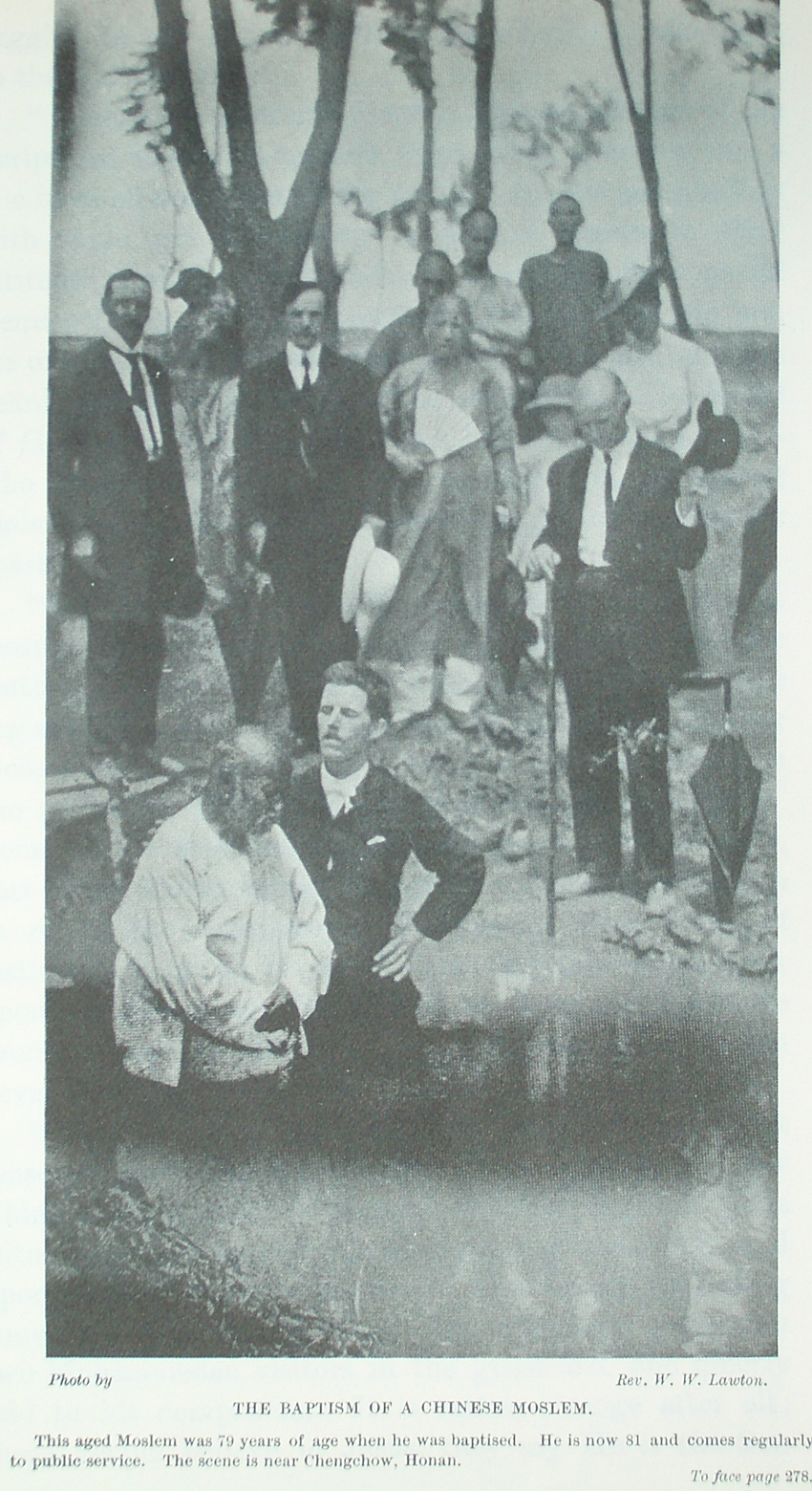
Christian missionaries baptizing a 79-year-old Chinese Muslim. (No later than 1908).

As the presence of Christian missionaries of various sects increased in China after the Opium Wars, they became interested in converting China's Muslims to Christianity. A significant amount of research was dedicated to the Muslim "problem", as Marshall Broomhall called it, but the effort resulted in no large-scale conversions.

Under the "fundamental laws" of China, one section is titled "Wizards, Witches, and all Superstitions, prohibited." The Jiaqing Emperor in 1814 A.D. added a sixth clause in this section with reference to Christianity. It was modified in 1821 and printed in 1826 by the Daoguang Emperor. It sentenced Europeans to death for spreading Christianity among Han Chinese and Manchus (tartars). Christians who would not repent their conversion were sent to Muslim cities in Xinjiang, to be given as slaves to Muslim leaders and beys.

== See also ==
- Islam during the Tang dynasty
- Islam during the Song dynasty
- Islam during the Yuan dynasty
- Islam during the Ming dynasty
- Shamanism during the Qing dynasty
- Religion in China
- Demographics of China
