= Ma Hualong =

Chinese Sufi leader (died 1871)

- 馬化龍 / 马化龙
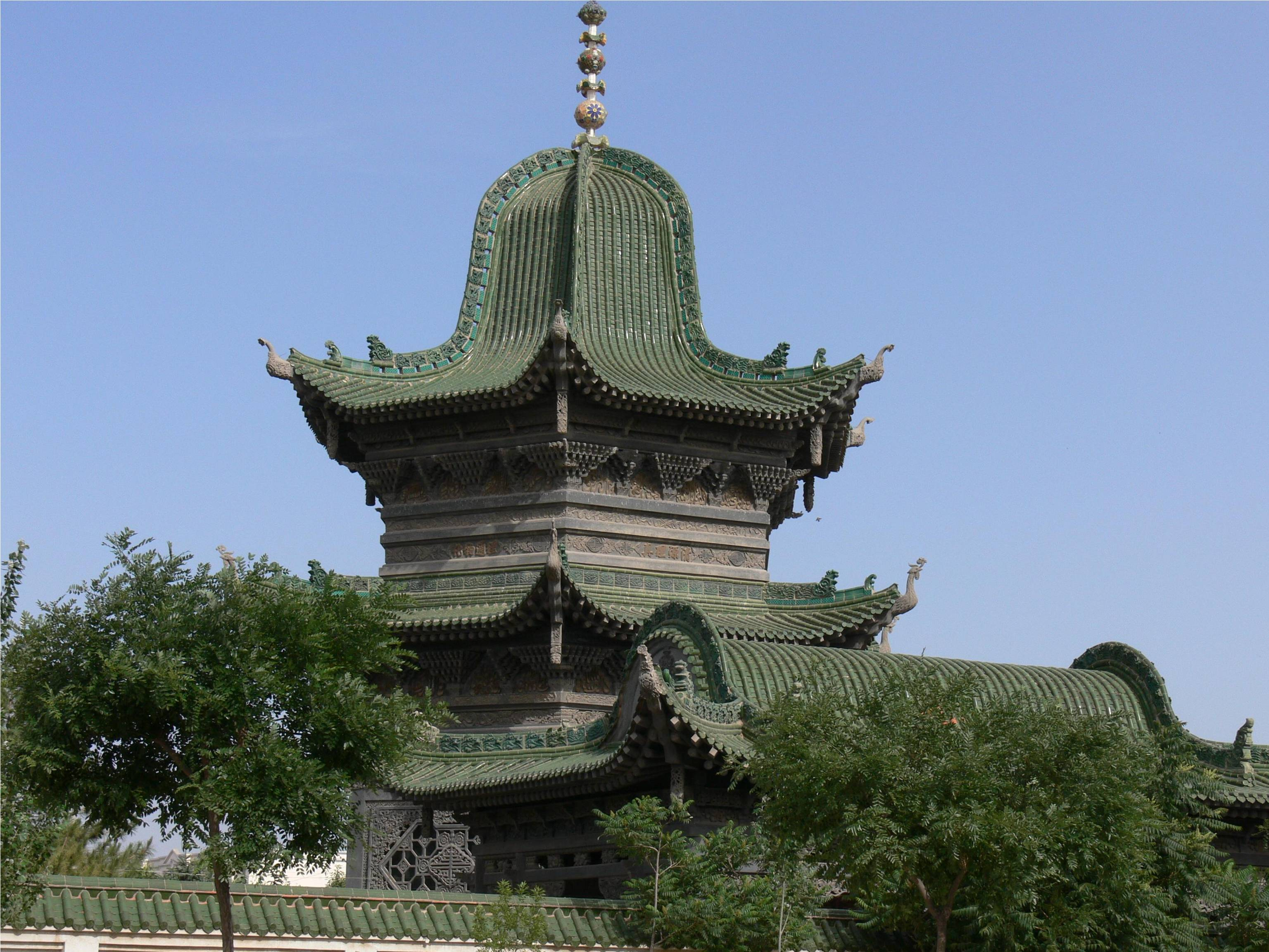
- Siqiliangzi Gongbei, mausoleum traditionally associated with Ma Hualong, in Wuzhong, Ningxia
- Title: Fifth shaykh of the Jahriyya

Personal life
- Born: Ma Hualong (馬化龍) c. 1810 Lingzhou, Gansu, Qing China
- Died: 2 March 1871 Jinjipu, Gansu, Qing China
- Home town: Jinjipu
- Children: Ma Yaobang
- Parent: Ma Yide (father)
- Era: 19th century
- Region: Northwest China, especially Ningxia and Gansu
- Known for: Fifth shaykh of the Jahriyya, religious leader and major figure in the Muslim rebellion against the Qing dynasty
- Other names: Ma Chaoqing (馬朝清), Alim Allah, Muhammad Imān (محمد إيمان), Tabirat Allah (Sufi title), Shisan Taiye (十三太爷, "Master of the Thirteenth")
- Occupation: Sufi shaykh, religious leader, merchant and military commander

Religious life
- Religion: Islam
- Denomination: Sunni
- Order: Jahriyya
- Lineage: Naqshbandiyya
- Jurisprudence: Hanafi
- Creed: Maturidi

Muslim leader
- Teacher: Ma Yide, his father and predecessor as Jahriyya shaykh
- Predecessor: Ma Yide
- Successor: Ma Jinxi and Ma Yuanzhang, associated with rival successor lineages
- Influenced by: Ma Mingxin (through the Jahriyya spiritual lineage), Ma Yide, Naqshbandiyya
- Influenced: Jahriyya communities across Ningxia, Gansu, Xinjiang, Yunnan and Inner Mongolia, later successor lineages associated with Ma Jinxi and Ma Yuanzhang

Ma Hualong (simplified Chinese: 马化龙; traditional Chinese: 馬化龍; pinyin: Mǎ Huàlóng; Wade–Giles: Ma Hua-lung) (died March 2, 1871), was the fifth leader (教主, jiaozhu) of the Jahriyya, a Sufi order (menhuan) in northwestern China. From the beginning of the anti-Qing Muslim Rebellion in 1862, and until his surrender and death in 1871, he was one of the main leaders of the rebellion.

== Biography ==
Ma Hualong became the leader of the Jahriyya ca. 1849, succeeding the menhuan's fourth shaykh, Ma Yide (late 1770s – 1849). Although the Jahriyya had been originally created by Ma Mingxin in the central Gansu, by the time of Ma Hualong's succession to the leadership position the order was centered in the northern Ningxia (which in the 19th century was also part of Gansu Province), its headquarters being located in Jinjipu (金积堡), a few kilometers south from today's Wuzhong City. The town of Jinjipu became an important religious and commercial center, and the menhuan's leaders grew wealthy thanks to the order's profitable participation in the caravan trade across Inner Mongolia, between Baotou, Huhhot and Beijing.

Since the beginning of the Muslim Rebellion in 1862, Ma Hualong was based at the Jahriyya headquarters in Jinjipu. The area of his direct influence included the Jahriyya-heavy eastern parts of the 19th-century Gansu Province, i.e. today's Ningxia and easternmost sections of today's Gansu. While the rebels elsewhere within the 19th-century borders of Gansu had their own leaders – notably, Ma Zhan'ao in Hezhou (now Linxia), Ma Guiyuan in Xining, and Ma Wenlu in Suzhou (Jiuquan), – who, in the view of modern historians, were acting essentially independent from each other, there were Jahriyya members (all owing allegiance to the Ma Hualong) participating in the rebellion throughout the region. Ma Guiyuan's sons were castrated after he was executed.

At some points during the rebellion Ma Hualong negotiated with the authorities, and at least once he even surrendered, taking a new name, "Ma Chaoqing" ("one who attends on the Qing"). However, instead of disbanding his militias, he continued fortifying Jinjipu, and collaborating with the rebels who had retreated to Gansu from Shaanxi.

Ma was besieged in Jinjipu in July 1869 by the Qing forces led by General Zuo Zongtang. After fortifications outside of the town itself had been captured by the government troops, and starvation started inside the walls, Ma Hualong surrendered in January 1871, hoping to spare the lives of his people. However, once Zuo's troops entered Jinjipu, a massacre followed, with over a thousand people losing their lives. and the town being destroyed.

Existing accounts on Ma Hualong's death differ. It is likely that he was executed on Zuo's orders on March 2, 1871, along with his son Ma Yaobang and over eighty rebel officials (supposedly, Zuo sentenced them to death by slicing), although it was said by some that he had been murdered by a traitor from within his own ranks.

== Family and succession ==
Few of Ma Hualong's family survived the massacre at Jinjipu. Two his

grandsons, Ma Jincheng and Ma Jinxi, were sentenced to castration upon reaching the age of 12. Ma Jincheng ended his days as a eunuch slave in Kaifeng in 1890, although the new Jahriyya leader, Ma Yuanzhang (the 1850s–1920), managed to secretly provide him with some support until his death. The younger grandson, Ma Jinxi, was spirited away, intact, from his Xi'an confinement by Ma Yuanzhang, and was hidden at a Hui household in Hangzhou.

Zuo executed a lot of Ma's relatives, except his daughter and grandson, who was sent to Yunnan. The grandson's name was Ma Tsen-wu.

Many years later, Ma Yuanzhang managed to obtain a pardon for Ma Jinxi, and Ma Hualong's grandson returned to Ningxia. A split within the Jahriyya followed, with some members becoming followers of Ma Jinxi, and others holding for Ma Yuanzhang (who claimed descent from the order's founder Ma Mingxin, and was also related to Ma Hualong's family through his marriage).

== Legacy ==
According to Jahriyya adherents in Ningxia, Ma Hualong's grave is in Dongta Town, which now is a suburb of Wuzhong City. Accordingly, a tomb shrine called Siqiliangzi gongbei (四旗梁子拱北) has been established there. More than 10,000 people from all over China attended a commemoration ceremony (ermaili) at that site in 1985.

Adherents of a rival tradition within Jahriyya, however, believe that Ma Hualong's true tomb is in Xuanhuagang, in Gansu's Zhangjiachuan County, which, coincidentally, was the base of Ma Hualong's successor, Ma Yuanzhang.

Some authors try to reconcile the two traditions, by saying that Ma Hualong's body is in Dongta, and the head is in Zhangjiachuan.
