= Jahriyya revolt =

1781 rebellion in Qinghai and Gansu, China

Jahriyya revolt (1781) or Salar revolt
Date	1781
Location	Qinghai, Gansu
Result	Qing victory

Belligerents
Qing Empire, Khafiya (Khufiyya) Sufi Muslims	Rebel Jahriyya Sufi Muslims

Commanders and leaders
Heshen; Agui; Fuk'anggan; Li Shiyao	Ma Mingxin; Su Sishisan

Strength
Loyalist Khufiyya Sufi Muslim and Gedimu Muslim Hui troops, Han Green Standard Army, Tibetans, Manchu Mongol, Salar and Han Eight Banners.	Rebel Jahriyya Sufi Muslim Hui, Rebel Jahriyya Sufi Muslim Salar, Santa people, Han Chinese rebels, 3,000 from Xunhua

The Jahriyya revolt (Chinese: 蘇四十三起義) of 1781 was a revolt involving sectarian violence between two suborders of the Naqshbandi Sufis – the Jahriyya Sufi Muslims and their rivals, the Khafiyya Sufi Muslims. This led to Qing intervention to stop the fighting between the two, which in turn led to a Jahriyya rebellion that China then crushed with the help of the Khufiyya (Khafiyya) Sufi Muslims.

Due to street fighting and lawsuits between the Jahriyya and Khufiyya Sufi orders, Ma Mingxin was arrested to stop the sectarian violence between the Sufis. The Jahriyya then tried to violently jailbreak Ma Mingxin which led to his execution and the crushing of the Jahriyya rebels. The Qing used Xinjiang as a place to put deported Jahriyya rebels.

The Khufiyya Sufis and Gedimu joined together against the Jahriyya Sufis whom they fiercely opposed and differed from in practices. Salar Jahriyyas were among those deported to Xinjiang. Some Han Chinese joined and fought alongside the Jahriyya Salar Muslim rebels in their revolt. Muslim loyalists fought for the Qing.

Jahriyya followers were also deported to Guizhou and Yunnan. The Jahriyya were labelled as the "New Teaching".

Corruption and embezzlement by officials was suggested as a contributing factor to the violence.

The Dungan Revolt (1895–96) broke out in the same place as the Jahriyya revolt for very similar reasons, sectarian violence and lawsuits between two Naqshbandi Sufi orders which the Qing tried to resolve.

Ma Mingxin's descendant was Ma Yuanzhang.

In addition to sending Han exiles convicted of crimes to Xinjiang to be slaves of Banner garrisons there, the Qing also practiced reverse exile, exiling Inner Asian (Mongol, Russian and Muslim criminals from Mongolia and Inner Asia) to China proper where they would serve as slaves in Han Banner garrisons in Guangzhou. Russian, Oirats and Muslims (Oros. Ulet. Hoise jergi weilengge niyalma) such as Yakov and Dmitri were exiled to the Han banner garrison in Guangzhou. In the 1780s after the Muslim rebellion in Gansu started by Zhang Wenqing 張文慶 was defeated, Muslims like Ma Jinlu 馬進祿 were exiled to the Han Banner garrison in Guangzhou to become slaves to Han Banner officers. The Qing code regulating Mongols in Mongolia sentenced Mongol criminals to exile and to become slaves to Han bannermen in Han Banner garrisons in China proper.

== See also ==
- Muslim groups in China
- Dungan revolt
- Dungan Revolt (1895–96)
- List of rebellions in China
- Islam in China
- History of Islam in China
- Islam during the Qing Dynasty
- Ma Yuanzhang
