= Guangtian Ha =

Guangtian Ha is an academic and assistant professor of religion at Haverford College in Pennsylvania. His scholarship specializes in Islam in China. He is the author of The Sound of Salvation: Voice, Gender, and the Sufi Mediascape in China, an ethnography of the Jahriyya Sufi order in northwestern China, and co-edited Ethnographies of Islam in China and The Contest of the Fruits.

Ha was arrested by U.S. federal authorities in October 2026 and indicted on cyberstalking charges for allegedly sending dozens of anonymous, antisemitic threats to a Jewish colleague and his family over social media. A federal judge ordered him detained pending trial. Following the charges, Haverford placed him on administrative leave and barred him from campus.
