= Chengzhi =

Chengzhi may refer to:

- Chengzhi Co., Ltd, a Chinese technology company based in Jiangxi
- Liao Chengzhi (1908-1983), Chinese Communist Party leader who played an important role in Sino-Japanese relations
- Zhang Chengzhi (b. 1948), China's most popular Muslim writer
