= Ma Yuanzhang =

Chinese Sufi master (c.1850–1920)

- ﻣَﺎ ﻳُوًا ﺟْﺎ (Xiao'erjing); Simplified Chinese: 马元章; Traditional Chinese: 馬元章
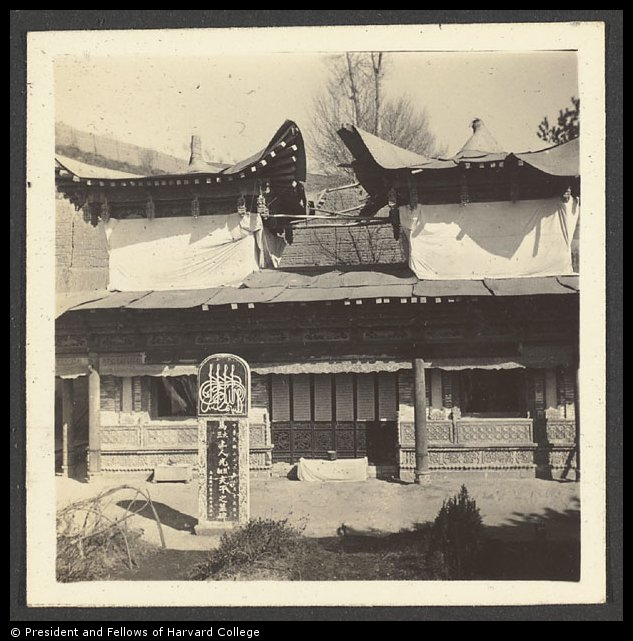
- Tombstone of Ma Yuanzhang in front of a draped building at Hsüan Hua Kang, Gansu, photographed in 1933 or 1936.
- Title: Mawlana Siddiq Allah

Personal life
- Born: Ma Yunpeng / 马云鹏 / 馬雲鵬; 1853 Tonghai, Yunnan, Qing China
- Died: 16 December 1920 Zhangjiachuan, Gansu, Republic of China
- Resting place: Hsüan Hua Kang, Gansu, China
- Parent: Ma Shilin / 马世林 / 馬世麟 (father)
- Era: Late Qing dynasty and early Republic of China
- Region: Northwest China
- Notable work(s): Shengji geyan (省己格言), Daozu shengping shilu (道祖生平实录), Jianshi xun (鉴石训), Daotonglun (道统论)
- Known for: Revival of the Jahriyya in northwest China, assistance to surviving descendants of Ma Hualong, leadership of Jahriyya militia during the Bai Lang Rebellion
- Other names: Guanglie / 光烈 (courtesy name), Zhenxiang / 祯祥 / 禎祥 (art name), Mawlana Siddiq Allah, Mǎ Yuánzhāng, Ma Yüan-chang
- Occupation: Sufi master, Islamic religious leader, educator, calligrapher
- Relatives: Ma Mingxin (great-grandfather), Ma Shaowu (nephew)

Religious life
- Religion: Islam
- Denomination: Sunni
- Jurisprudence: Hanafi
- Tariqa: Jahriyya, an offshoot of the Naqshbandi order
- Creed: Maturidi

Muslim leader
- Post: Seventh shaykh / jiaozhu of the Jahriyya

Ma Yuanzhang (Xiao'erjing: ﻣَﺎ ﻳُﻮًا ﺟْﺎ, simplified Chinese: 马元章; traditional Chinese: 馬元章; pinyin: Mǎ Yuánzhāng; Wade–Giles: Ma Yüan-chang) was a Chinese Sufi master, of the Jahriyya menhuan (Naqshbandi Sufi order).

== Jiaozhu of the Jahriyya ==
Ma Mingxin's descendant was Ma Yuanzhang.

When Agui defeated Su Forty-three and the new teaching in the Jahriyya revolt of 1781, the family of Ma Mingxin was exiled to Yunnan. Where they lived in the western Muslim community, converting the Yunnan Muslims to the Jahriyya sect. Ma Yuanzhang's father, Ma Shilin, travelled from Yunnan to Ningxia to visit Ma Hualong two times. After Du Wenxiu rebelled in the Panthay Rebellion, Ma Shilin joined him as a garrison commander and civil official. He defended Donggouzhai fort for a year against the Qing and then committed suicide. Ma Shilin's son Ma Yuanzhang and his other sons went to Sichuan.

Ma Yuanzhang searched for surviving children of Ma Hualong. Few of Ma Hualong's family survived the massacre at Jinjipu. Two of his grandsons, Ma Jincheng and Ma Jinxi, were sentenced to castration upon reaching the age of 12. Ma Jincheng ended his days as a eunuch slave in Kaifeng in 1890, although the new Jahriyya leader, Ma Yuanzhang (the 1850s - 1920), managed to secretly provide him with some support until his death. The younger grandson, Ma Jinxi, was spirited away, intact, from his Xi'an confinement by Ma Yuanzhang, and was hidden at a Hui household in Hangzhou. Many years later, Ma Yuanzhang managed to obtain a pardon for Ma Jinxi, and Ma Hualong's grandson returned to Ningxia. A split within the Jahriyya followed, with some members becoming followers of Ma Jinxi, and others holding for Ma Yuanzhang (who claimed descent from the order's founder Ma Mingxin and was also related to Ma Hualong's family through his marriage).

Ma Yuanzhang commanded the Jahriyya militia against the Bai Lang Rebellion.

He and Ma Fuxiang became enemies after Ma Fuxiang was angry that Ma Yuanzhang refused to help him remove Zhang Guangjian as governor of Gansu and telegraphed Beijing that Zhang should remain as governor. Ma Fuxiang and other Gansu Generals believed a native of Gansu should be governor.

Ma Yuanzhang was treated with extreme respect by his adherents; he was nicknamed the "New Prophet", and his residence was considered a "sanctuary".

In 1913 the revolt of Tömür Khälphä in Qumul was crushed by Yang Zengxin with the help of the Turpan-based Ma Yuanzhang's religious representative "ra'is" Jin Yunlun 金云仑.

Ma Yuanzhang and his son were then crushed to death during the 1920 Haiyuan earthquake on December 16, 1920, in the Mosque he was in near Zhangjiachuan.

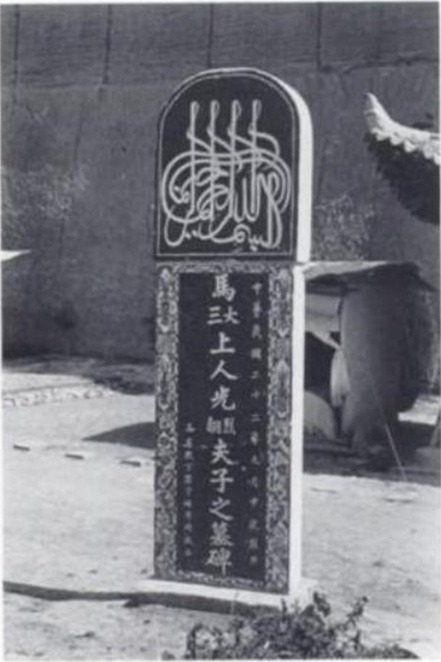
Grave of Ma Yuanzhang, the Sufi Grand Master, in China

== Family ==
According to his great-grandson, Ma Yuanzhang was a direct descendant of Ma Mingxin, founder of the Jahriyya, and an uncle of Ma Shaowu, an important military commander in Xinjiang. Ma Shenglin (马圣鳞)马圣鳞 was a great uncle of Ma Shaowu and therefore also related to Ma Yuanzhang.

He wrote a couplet in honor of Ma Shaowu.

== Couplet Written in Honor of Ma Shaowu by Ma Yuanzhang ==
Ten thousand li to pay his respects at the isolated tomb and satisfy the wish of the founding ancestor,
Those that satisfy the wishes of their ancestors are truly filial.
In the home province he built up the embankment in honour of the departed sage,
Not only by showing respect for the departed but in his countenance he is a true worthy descendant.

万里祭孤坟而绍祖志，能绍先志方称孝子。
原籍修河堤而祭前圣，亦继前象乃为贤孙。
