= Salar people =

Turkic ethnic group of China

撒拉族 (Chinese) Salırlar (Salar)
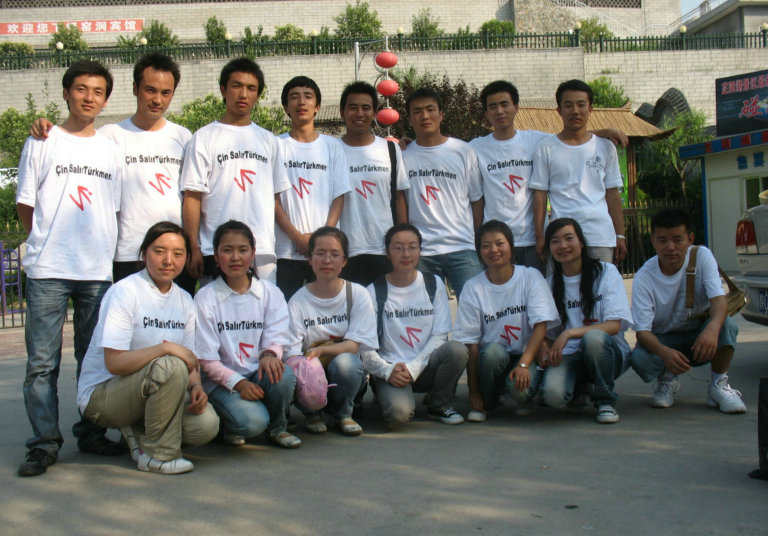
- Salar Turkmens in Xi'an China celebrating Sabantuy (2009)

Total population
- 165,159

Regions with significant populations
- China (Qinghai, Gansu, Xinjiang)

Languages
- Salar, Mandarin

Religion
- Sunni Islam

Related ethnic groups
- Turkmens; Turkish people; Azerbaijanis

The Salar people, also called Salır Turkmens or Salır Turks are a Turkic ethnic minority in China who speak Salar, a Turkic language of the Oghuz sub-branch. They numbered 165,159 people in 2020, according to that year's national census.

The Salars live mostly in the Qinghai–Gansu border region, on both sides of the Yellow River, namely in Xunhua Salar Autonomous County and Hualong Hui Autonomous County of Qinghai and the adjacent Jishishan Bonan, Dongxiang and Salar Autonomous County of Gansu. There are also Salars in some parts of Henan and Shanxi, as well as in northern Xinjiang, in the Ili Kazakh Autonomous Prefecture. They are a patriarchal agricultural society and predominantly Muslim.

== History ==
=== Origin ===
According to Salar tradition and Chinese chronicles, the Salars are the descendants of the Salur tribe, belonging to the Oghuz Turk tribe of the Western Turkic Khaganate. During the Tang dynasty, the Salur tribe moved within China's borders and have lived since then in the Qinghai-Gansu border region. Over the centuries, they mixed with neighboring Tibetans, Hui, Han Chinese and Dongxiangs, developing the distinctive modern Salar language and culture.

==== Islamic legend ====
According to a legend, two brothers named Haraman and Ahman, possibly forefathers of the present day Salar tribe, lived in the Samarkand area. They were highly ranked at local Islamic mosques, which led to persecution from local rulers. The two brothers fled along with eighteen members of the tribe on a white camel with water, soil and a Quran before heading east. The group trekked through the northern route of the Tian Shan range into the Jiayu Pass, passing through what is now Gansu (Jiuquan, Ganzhou, Zhangye; Ningxia, Qinzhou, Tianshui, and Gangu County), eventually stopping at the present Xiahe County. Later, another forty people from Samarkand joined the group. The group passed through the southern route of the Tian Shan and entered Qinghai. They arrived at the present Guide County and twelve of them settled there.

The Quran the two brothers brought on their journey to China is to this day still preserved in Xunhua Salar Autonomous County at Jiezi Grand Mosque in Haidong, Qinghai. The Nanjing Museum has repaired the Quran to protect it from decaying.

=== Ming dynasty ===
The Salar clan leaders voluntarily capitulated to the Ming dynasty around 1370. The chief of the four upper clans around this time was Han Baoyuan and the Ming government granted him office of centurion, it was at this time the people of his four clans took Han as their surname. The other chief, Han Shanba, of the four lower Salar clans got the same office from the Ming government and his clans were the ones who took Ma as their surname. The ethnogenesis of the Salar started from when they pledged allegiance to the Ming dynasty under their leader Han Bao. Han Bao's father was Omar and Omar's father was Haraman, who led the Salars on their journey from Central Asia to China.

According to Salar oral history, Tibetan women were the original wives of the first Salars to arrive in the Qinghai region. Supposedly, they were only permitted to marry the women after a compromise between the Tibetan ruler of Wimdo Valley and the newcomers. He demanded that the Salars install prayer flags, which are a Tibetan Buddhist practice, on the four corners of their homes, that they pray with prayer wheels with mantras on them, and to bow before statues of Buddhas. The Salars initially refused the demands based on their religion but eventually compromised on the flags by placing stones on the corners of their houses instead, which is still practiced to this day. For this reason, Salars are often bilingual in Amdo Tibetan and the two groups often use the term "maternal uncle" to refer each other, referencing the Salars' Tibetan ancestry. Many Salar customs and practices have been influenced by Tibetan culture and there are numerous Tibetan loanwords in the Salar language.

In eastern Qinghai and Gansu, there were cases of Tibetan women who remained Buddhists while marrying Hui men; they had sons who would be Buddhist or Muslim. The Buddhist sons became lamas while the other sons were Muslims. (Note: The Tibet Journal, Volume 20, p. 101: "Central Asian Sufi Masters who gave to the founder of the Chinese Qādiriyya his early training.25 Gladney wrote in his book Chinese Muslims that Afāq Khvāja preached to the northeastern Tibetans but he does not tell us what are his sources. ... The cities of northwestern China visited by the khvāja are Xining (in Qinghai), Hezhou (the old name for Linxia, the Chinese Mecca) in Gansu and Xunhua near the Gansu-Qinghai border where the Salar Turks live amidst a predominantly Tibetan Buddhist population. Gansu is a natural corridor linking China with Eastern Turkestan and Central Asia It is a ... passageway through which the silk road slipped between the Tibetan plateau to the west and the Mongolian grasslands to the north. In addition to the Chinese and the Tibetans, Gansu was also home to different people like the Salar Turks and the Dongxiang or Mongol Muslims, both preached to by Afāq Khvāja. ... (actually the city of Kuna according to Nizamüddin Hüsäyin.26 Although the Salars intermarried with the Tibetans, Chinese and Hui, they have maintained their customs until now. From the Mission d'Ollone who explored this area at the beginning of the century, we learn that some Chinese Muslims of this area married Tibetan women who had kept their religion, i.e. Lamaism, and that their sons were either Muslim or Buddhist. We are told for example that in one of these families, there was one son who was a Muslim and the other who became a Lama. Between the monastery of Lha-brang and the city of Hezhou (Linxia, it is also indicated that there were Muslims living in most of the Chinese and Tibetan...") The Kargan Tibetans, who live next to the Salar, have mostly become Muslim due to their influence.

Hui and Salar often intermarry due to their cultural similarities and shared religion, especially after the Ming Dynasty established control over the Xunhua Salars in 1370 and gave control to Hezhou officials. Many Hezhou Hui began to migrate to the region afterwards On the other hand, there are comparatively few Han-Salar marriages. The Salars do use Han surnames, however. Compared to Salar men, few Salar women married outside; the sole exception is Hui men taking Salar women as their wives while Tibetan women make up the majority of the spouses of Salar men who marry outside their ethnicity and it has been reported that Salars have a total avoidance of marriages with Han. As a result, Salars are heavily mixed with other ethnicities. (Note: Central Asiatic Journal, Volume 43–44, p. 212: "... towards outsiders, the Salar language has been retained. Additionally, the ethnic group has been continuously absorbing a great amount of new blood from other nationalities. In history, with the exception of Hui, there is no case of a Salar's daughter marrying a non-Salar. On the contrary, many non-Salar females married into Salar households. As folk accounts and historical records recount, shortly after Salar ancestors reached Xunhua, they had relationships with neighbouring Tibetans through marriage . Tibetan women primarily married into Salar males ' households and, af- terwards, brides were expected to convert to Islam")

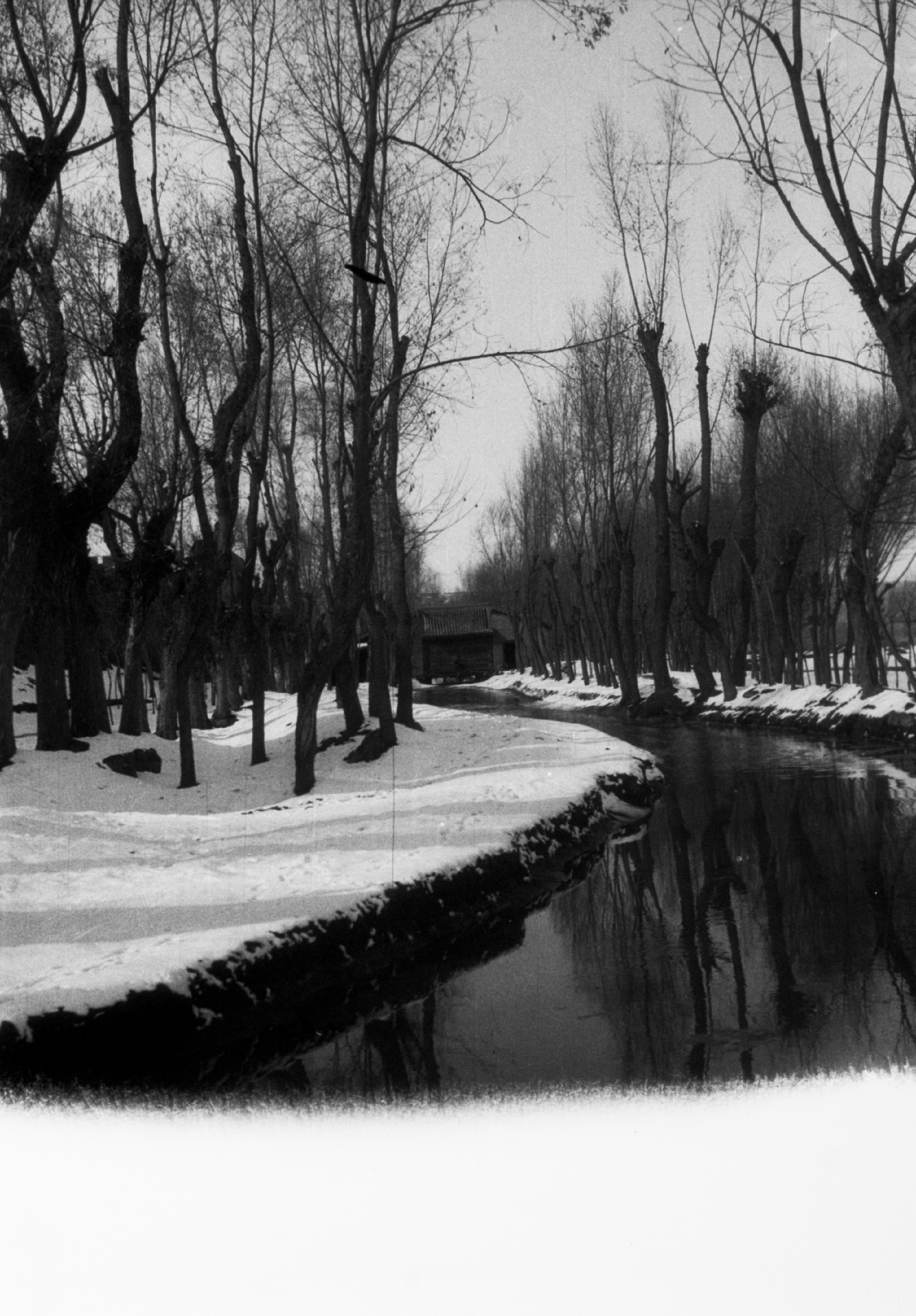
Salar Muslim settlement, outside of Jishi Town, Xunhua, Qinghai, 1932.

Salars in Qinghai live on both the northern and southern banks of the Yellow River; northern Salars are called Hualong or Bayan Salars while southern Salars are called Xunhua Salars. The northern region is a mix between discontinuous Salar and Tibetan villages while the southern region is more solidly Salar, as the Hui and Salars pushed out the Tibetans prior.

After moving in, the Salars originally practiced the same Gedimu variant of Sunni Islam as the Hui did and adopted Hui practices, such as Hui Islamic educational practices, which were derived from Yuan Dynasty era Arabic and Persian primers. One such Salar primer was called the "Book of Diverse Studies" (雜學本本).

Salars were often multilingual, having knowledge of Salar, Mongol, Chinese, Tibetan due to historically trading on the Yellow River in Ningxia and Lanzhou in Gansu. The Salars were permitted an enormous amount of autonomy and self-rule by the Ming dynasty, which gave them command of taxes, military and the courts. The Ming and Qing dynasties often mobilized Salars into their militaries as soldiers, with the Ming government recruiting them at 17 different times for service and the Qing government at 5 different times.

=== Qing dynasty ===
In the 1670s, the Kashgarian Sufi master Āfāq Khoja (and possibly his father Muhammad Yūsuf) preached to the Salars and introduced Sufism into their community. In the mid-18th century, one of Āfāq Khoja's spiritual descendants, Ma Laichi, began to spread his teachings, known as Khufiyya among the Salars, as well among their Chinese-speaking and Tibetan-speaking neighbors.

The Kangxi Emperor incited anti-Muslim sentiment among the Mongols of Qinghai in order to gain support against the Dzungar Oirat Mongol leader Galdan. Kangxi claimed that Chinese Muslims inside China, such as Turkic Muslims in Qinghai, were plotting with Galdan, who he claimed had turned his back on Buddhism and the Dalai Lama in favor of Islam. According to Kangxi, Galdan was plotting to invade in conspiracy with Chinese Muslims and wished to install a Muslim as ruler of China. By contrast, under Qianlong Emperor, he had a more appeasing policy toward the Turkic Muslims in Qinghai, including recruiting them for the conquest of Dzungaria later on; many Salars, largely under the Hui umbrella, took part in the Dzungar genocide, in which Salars, alongside the Karluk Uyghurs, openly massacred en masse the Dzungars, as well as the other nomads like Kazakhs and Kyrgyz, as well as serving under the Qing banner in the First Sino–Kazakh War.

Throughout the 1760s and 1770s, another Chinese Sufi master, Ma Mingxin, was spreading his version of Sufi teaching, known as Jahriyya throughout the Gansu province (which then included Salar's homeland in today's Qinghai). Many Salars became adherents of Jahriyya or the "New Teaching", as the Qing government officials dubbed it (in opposition to the "Old Teaching", i.e. both the Khufiyya Sufi order and the non-Sufi Gedimu Islam). While the external differences between the Khufiyya and the Jahriyya would look comparatively trivial to an outsider (the two orders were most known for, respectively, the silent or vocal dhikr, i.e. invocation of the name of God), the conflict between their adherents often became violent.

Sectarian violence between the Jahriyya and Khufiyya broke out repeatedly until the major episode of violence in 1781. In 1781, the authorities, concerned with the spread of the "subversive" "New Teaching" among the Salars, whom they (perhaps unfairly) viewed as a fierce and troublesome lot, arrested Ma Mingxin and sent an expedition to the Salar community of Xunhua County to round up his supporters there. In the Jahriyya revolt sectarian violence between two suborders of the Naqshbandi Sufis, the Jahriyya Sufi Muslims and their rivals, the Khafiyya Sufi Muslims, led to a Jahriyya Sufi Muslim rebellion which the Qing dynasty in China crushed with the help of the Khafiyya Sufi Muslims.

The Jahriyya Salars of Xunhua, led by their ahong (imam) nicknamed Su Sishisan ("Su Forty-three", 苏四十三), responded by killing the government officials and destroying their task force at the place called Baizhuangzi and then rushed across the Hezhou region to the walls of Lanzhou, where Ma Mingxin was imprisoned. When the besieged officials brought Ma Mingxin, wearing chains, to the Lanzhou city wall, to show him to the rebels, Su's Salars at once showed respect and devotion to their imprisoned leaders. Scared officials took Ma down from the wall and beheaded him right away. Su's Salars tried attacking the Lanzhou city walls, but, not having any siege equipment, failed to penetrate into the walled city. The Salar fighters (whose strength at the time is estimated by historians to be in 1,000–2,000 range) then set up a fortified camp on a hill south of Lanzhou. Some Han Chinese, Hui and Dongxiang (Santa) joined the Salar in the rebellion against the Qing.

To deal with the rebels, Imperial Commissioners Agui and Heshen were sent to Lanzhou. Unable to dislodge the Salars from their fortified camp with his regular troops, Agui sent the "incompetent" Heshen back to Beijing and recruited Alashan Mongols and Southern Gansu Tibetans to aid the Lanzhou garrison. After a three months' siege of the rebel camp and cutting off the Salars' water supply, Agui's joint forces destroyed the Jahriya rebels; Su and all his fighters were all killed in the final battle. Overall, it is said that as much as 40% of their entire population was killed in the revolt.

As late as 1937, a folk ballad was still told by the Salars about the rebellion of 1781 and Su Sishisan's suicidal decision to go to war against the Qing Empire. (Note: Lipman's source for this is Qianlong Sishiliu Nian (translation: The 46th year of the Qianlong era), by Wang Shumin, the ethnographer who recorded the ballad in 1937.)

The Qing government deported some of the Salar Jahriyya rebels to the Ili valley which is in modern-day Xinjiang. Today, a community of a few thousand Salars speaking a distinct dialect of Salar still live there. Salar migrants from Amdo (Qinghai) came to settle the region as religious exiles, migrants and as soldiers enlisted in the Qing army to fight rebels in Ili, often following the Hui. The distinctive dialect of the Ili Salar differs from the other Salar dialects because the neighboring Kazakh and Uyghur languages in Ili influenced it. The Ili Salar population numbers around 4,000 people. There have been instances of misunderstanding between speakers of Ili Salar and Qinghai Salar due to the divergence of the dialects. The differences between the two dialect result in a "clear isogloss".

From the 1880s to the 1890s, sectarian strife was rife in the Salar community of Xunhua again. This time, the conflict was among two factions of the Hua Si menhuan (order) of the Khufiyya and in 1895 the local Qing officials ended up siding with the reformist faction within the order. Although the factional conflict was evident not only in Salar Xunhua but in Hui Hezhou as well, the troops were first sent to Xunhua – which again precipitated a Salar rebellion, which spread to many Hui and Dongxiang communities of Gansu too. It turned into the Dungan Revolt (1895), which was crushed by a loyalist Hui army.

The later Qing dynasty and Republic of China Salar General Han Youwen was born to a Tibetan woman named Ziliha (孜力哈) and a Salar father named Aema (阿額瑪).

The Hui people, also known as the "white capped Hui", used incense during worship, while the Salar, also known as "black capped Hui", considered this to be a heathen ritual and denounced it.

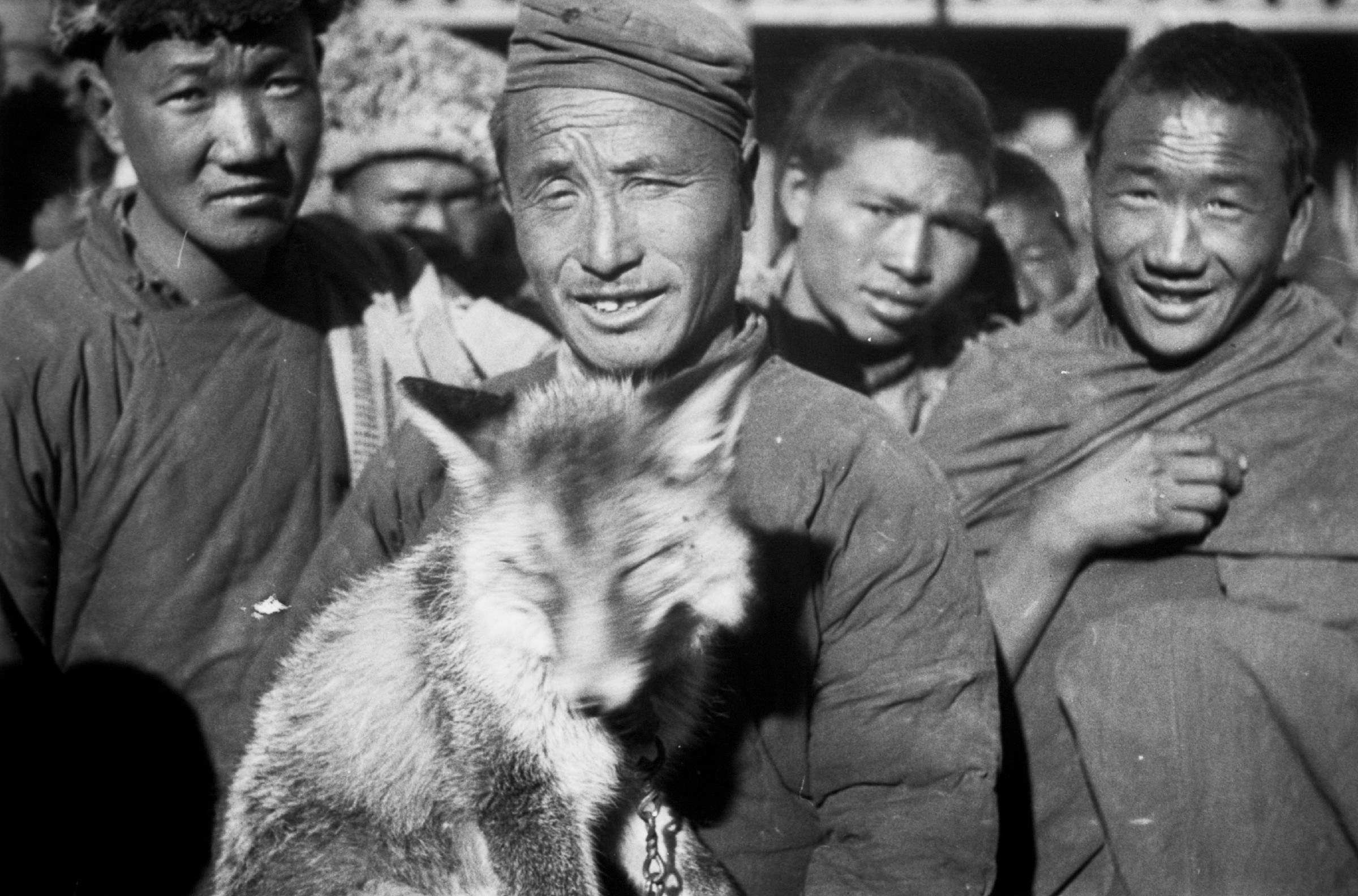
A Salar Muslim with a captured fox at the market, Labrang, Xiahe County, Gansu, 1934.

=== Modern era ===
Salars served in general Dong Fuxiang's Kansu Braves army against the foreign western and Japanese Eight Nation Alliance in the Boxer rebellion. Other Muslims like Dongxiang, Bonan and Hui also served in the Kansu-Tibetan Braves.

Like other Muslims in China, the Salars served extensively in the Chinese military. It was said that they and the Dongxiang were given to "eating rations", a reference to military service.

During the Second Sino-Japanese War, Salar troops and officers served in the Qinghai army of the Muslim general Ma Biao and they battled extensively in bloody battles against the Imperial Japanese Army in Henan province. In 1937, during the Battle of Beiping–Tianjin the Chinese government was notified by Muslim General Ma Bufang of the Ma clique that he was prepared to bring the fight to the Japanese in a telegram message. Immediately after the Marco Polo Bridge Incident, Ma Bufang arranged for a cavalry division under Ma Biao to be sent east to battle the Japanese. Salars made up the majority of the first cavalry division which was sent by Ma Bufang. The Qinghai Chinese, Salar, Chinese Muslim, Dongxiang and Tibetan troops Ma Biao led fought to the death against the Japanese or committed suicide refusing to be taken as prisoner. In September 1940, when the Japanese made an offensive against the Muslim Qinghai troops, the Qinghai ambushed them and killed so many of the Japanese soldiers that they were forced to retreat. The Japanese could not even pick up their dead, they instead cut an arm from their corpses limbs for cremation to send back to Japan. The Japanese did not dare make an offensive like that again.

Han Youwen, a Salar general in the National Revolutionary Army and member of the Kuomintang (Nationalist Party), directed the defense of the city of Xining during air raids by Japanese planes. Han survived an aerial bombardment by Japanese planes in Xining while he was being directed via telephone from Ma Bufang, who hid in an air raid shelter in a military barracks. The bombing resulted in human flesh splattering a Blue Sky with a White Sun flag and Han being buried in rubble. Han Youwen was dragged out of the rubble while bleeding and he managed to grab a machine gun while he was limping and fired back at the Japanese warplanes. He later defected to the Communist People's Liberation Army, serving in numerous military positions and as vice chairman of Xinjiang. He had led Chinese Muslim forces against Soviet and Mongol forces in the Pei-ta-shan Incident.

== Culture ==
Most Salars live in Qinghai province

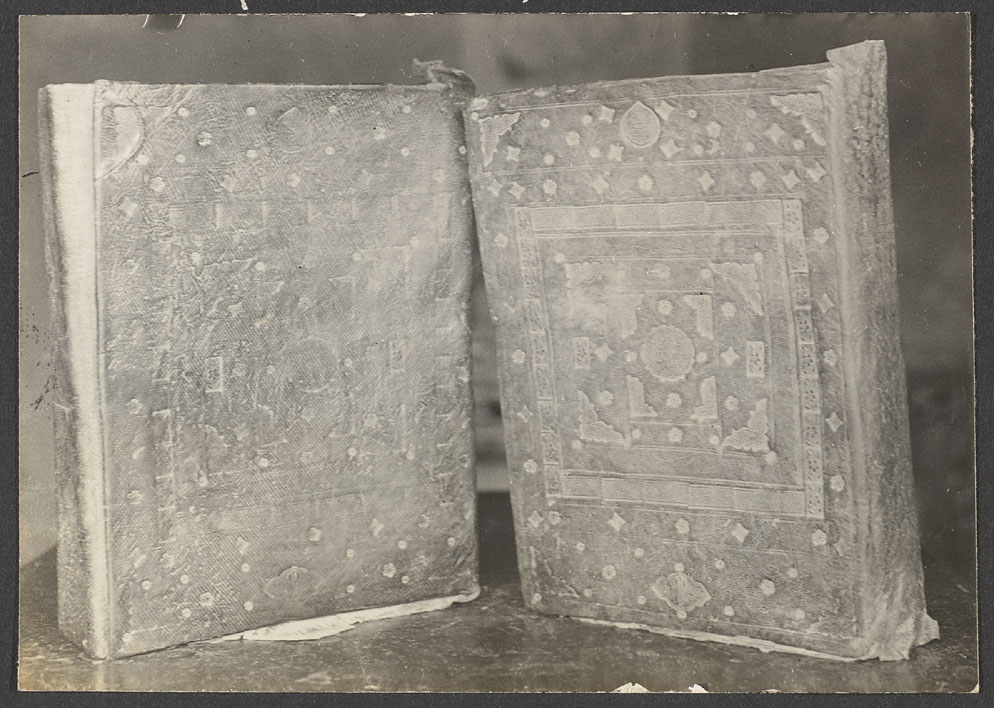
Copy of the Quran brought by Salar Muslims from Samarkand in 1371. (In 2 volumes)

The Salar had their own unique kinship clanships. Matchmakers and parents arrange marriages among the Salar. The Salar are an entrepreneurial people, going into multiple businesses and industries. They practice agriculture and horticulture. They cultivate chili and pepper in their gardens. Buckwheat, millet, wheat and barley are among the crops they grow. Other important crops include melons, grapes, apples, apricots and walnuts. A few Salar raise livestock and the local timber industry is also another source of income for some villages.

Hui general Ma Fuxiang recruited Salars into his army, and said they moved to China since the Tang dynasty. His classification of them is in two groups, five inner clans, eight outer clans. Ma said the outer group speaks Tibetan, no longer knowing their native language. Salars only married other Salars. Uighurs have said that they were unable to understand the Salar language.

Ma and Han are the two most widespread names among the Salar. Like the Hui, Ma is meant to substitute for Muhammad; however, many Salars also have the surname Ma due to intermarriage with the Hui. The upper four clans of the Salar assumed the surname Han and lived west of Xunhua. One of these Salar surnamed Han was Han Yimu, a Salar officer who served under General Ma Bufang. He fought in the Kuomintang Islamic Insurgency in China (1950–1958), leading Salars in a revolt in 1952 and 1958. Ma Bufang, enlisted Salars as officers in his army by exclusively targeting Xunhua and Hualong as areas to draw officers from.

18.69 years was the average first marriage age for Salar women in 2000, while Tibetan women were married at 23.8 years on average in 1990.

=== Clothing ===
The typical clothing of the Salar is very similar to the Hui people in the region. The men are commonly bearded and dress in white shirts and white or black skullcaps. The traditional clothing for men is jackets and gowns. The young single women are accustomed to dressing in Chinese dress of bright colors. Married women utilize the traditional veil in white or black colors.

=== Music ===
Singing is part of Salar culture. A style of singing called Hua'er is shared among the Han, Hui, Salar and Tibetans in Qinghai province. They have a musical instrument called the Kouxuan. It is a string instrument manufactured in silver or in copper and only played by the women.

== Language ==
Tamga of Salur (tribe).

The people of China and Salar themselves regard the Salar language as a Tujue language (Turk language) (突厥語言). The Salar language has two large dialect groups. The divergence is due to the fact that one branch in Xunhua county of Qinghai province and Gansu province was influenced by the Tibetan languages and Chinese and the other branch in Ili Kazakh Autonomous Prefecture by the Uyghur and Kazakh languages.

In the late 1990s, it was estimated that out of the some 89,000 Salars, around 60,000 spoke the Salar language.

Most Salar do not use any written script for the Salar language, instead they use Chinese characters for practical purposes. Salar serves as their spoken language, while Chinese serves as a both spoken and written language. Many of the current generation of Salars are fluent in Chinese and Tibetan.

The Salar language spoken in Amdo Tibet (Qinghai) is a language of Turkic origin that has been heavily influenced by the Chinese and Tibetan languages. Around 20% of the vocabulary is of Chinese origin and 10% is of Tibetan origin. Morphological and syntactic structures have been fully borrowed from these latter languages. Yet, according to author William Safran, linguistic works published in China treat Salar as if it has few loanwords from these languages, omitting most Chinese and Tibetan features. The Salar mostly use the Chinese writing system, although Latin and Arabic alphabets are used on occasion. The Salar language has taken loans and influence from neighboring Chinese varieties. It is neighboring variants of Chinese which have loaned words to the Salar language. In Qinghai, many Salar men speak both the Qinghai dialect of Chinese and Salar. Rural Salars can speak Salar fluently while urban Salars often assimilate into the Chinese-speaking Hui population.

In Ili Salar, the i and y high front vowels, when placed after an initial glide, are spirantized with j transforming into ʝ. Qinghai and Ili Salar have mostly the same consonantal development.

== Religion ==
Salars profess Sunni Islam and follow the Hanafi school of law. In addition to their traditional places, they live in cities, mainly inhabited by other Muslims like Hui. Islamic Education Received at Gaizi Mişit Madrasah in Jiezi Village.

Many Salar adhere to the Naqshbandi Sufi order, which spread throughout the region in the 17th and 18th centuries.

== Genetics ==
The Y-DNA haplogroups and therefore the paternal genetic lineages of the Salar people, exhibit a mix of West Eurasian and East Asian haplogroups. Their maternal lineages are overwhelmingly East Asian. About 24–30% Y chromosomes of Salar belong to the East Asian specific haplogroup O3-M122, while the Central Asian, South Asian and European prevalent Y chromosomal lineage R-M17 comprises only 17%. Other Y-DNA haplogroups among the Salars are D1 and C3. Another study showed that the haplogroup O1b1a1a1b2 was also present in Salars.

An autosomal genetic study (Ma et al. 2021) estimated that West Eurasian-related admixture (represented by ancient Andronovo samples) among Salars was at ~9.1% to ~11.8%, with the remainder being dominant East Eurasian ancestry; might derive from "Yellow River Basin farmers" (YR_LBIA) or "Liao River farmers" (WLR_LN) at ~88.2 to ~90.9%. The study also showed that there is a close genetic affinity among ethnic minorities in Northwestern China (Uyghurs, Huis, Dongxiangs, Bonans, Yugurs and Salars) and that these cluster closely with other East Asian people, especially with other Chinese Turkic, Mongolic and Tungusic speakers, indicating the probability of a shared recent common ancestor of "Altaic speakers".

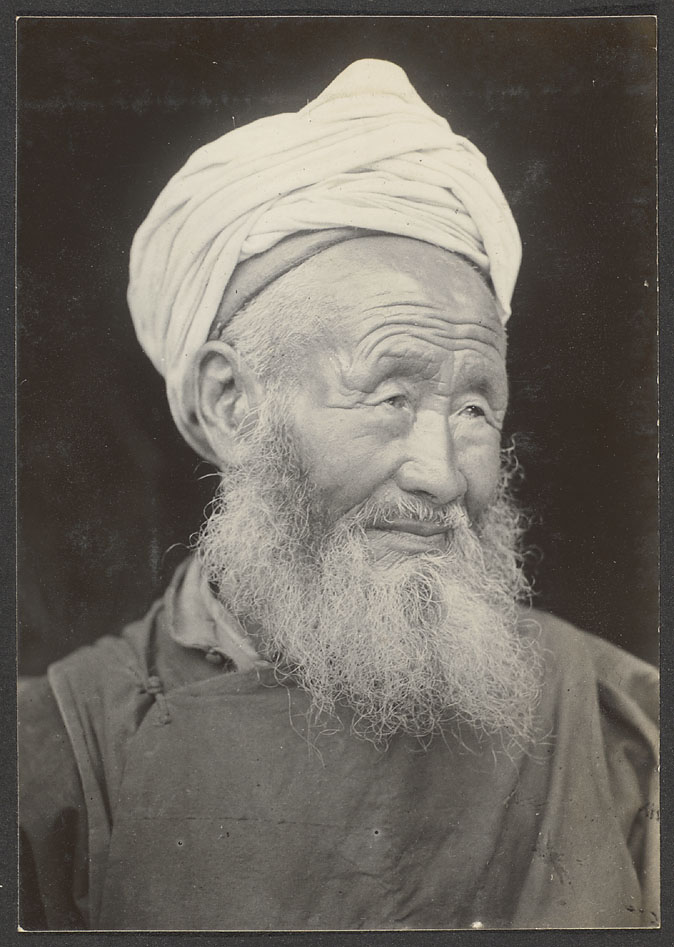
A Salar Muslim from Xunhua, 1933

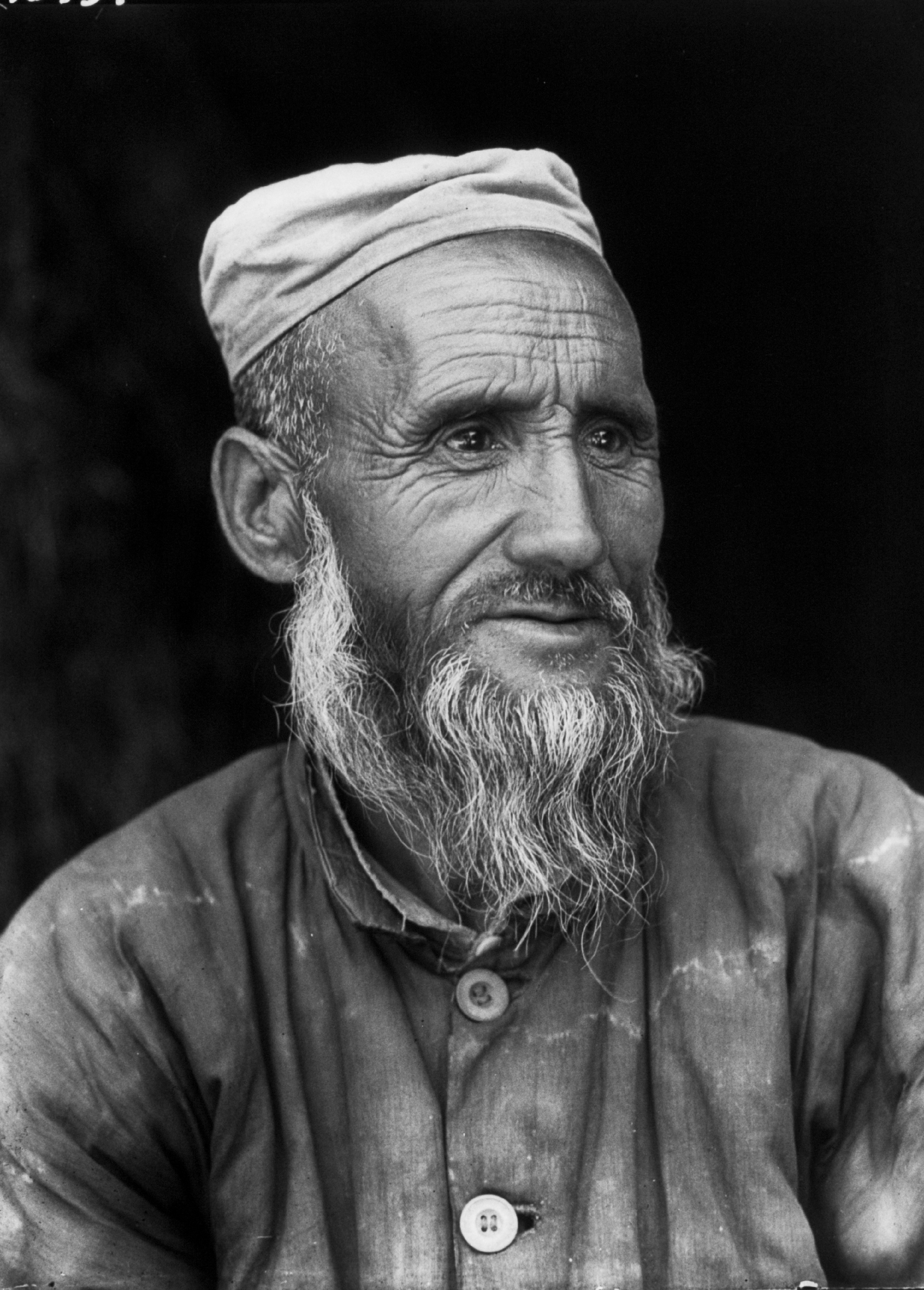
A Salar Muslim manager in Jishi Town, Xunhua, Qinghai, 1932

== Literature ==
- Ma Jianzhong; Stuart, Kevin (1996). "'Stone Camels and Clear Springs': The Salar's Samarkand Origins". Asian Folklore Studies. 55 (2): 287–298. doi:10.2307/1178823. JSTOR 1178823.
- Ma Wei; Ma Jianzhong; Stuart, Kevin, eds. (2001). Folklore of China's Islamic Salar Nationality. Lewiston, New York: Edwin Mellen.
- Ma Wei; Ma Jianzhong; Stuart, Kevin (1999). "The Xunhua Salar Wedding". Asian Folklore Studies. 58 (1): 31–76. doi:10.2307/1178890. JSTOR 1178890.
- Lipman, Jonathan Neaman (1998). Familiar strangers: a history of Muslims in Northwest China. Hong Kong University Press. ISBN 978-962-209-468-0.
- Tenišev, E.R (1976). Stroj salarskogo âzyka [The structure of the Salar language]. Moscow: Nauka.
- Lin Lianyun (林莲云) (1992). 汉撒拉、撒拉汉词汇 [Chinese-Salar Salar-Chinese lexicon] (in Chinese). Chengdu: People's Press of Sichuan.
