= Ma Mingxin =

Chinese Sufi master

- 馬明心 / 马明心
- Memorial marker for Ma Mingxin at a gongbei in Banqiao
- Title: Wiqāyatullāh, Dàozǔ Tàiyé (道祖太爷)

Personal life
- Born: Ma Mingxin (馬明心); 1718 or 1719 Jiezhou, Gansu, Qing China (present-day Longnan, Gansu, China)
- Died: 27 March 1781 Lanzhou, Gansu, Qing China
- Resting place: Dongshaomen Gongbei, Lanzhou, China; the original tomb was destroyed and subsequently reconstructed
- Home town: Hezhou (present-day Linxia City)
- Spouse: Zhang (surname recorded in historical sources)
- Era: 18th century
- Region: Northwest China, particularly Gansu, Ningxia and Qinghai
- Main interest(s): Sufism, Islamic religious reform, dhikr, Islamic law and religious authority
- Notable idea(s): Vocal dhikr (jahr), religious reform, the integration of Islamic law and Sufi practice, opposition to the incorporation of Chinese religious customs into Islamic worship
- Education: Islamic studies in Yemen and Egypt, including studies at Al-Azhar University, and Sufi training in the Naqshbandi tradition
- Known for: Founder of the Jahriyya, a major Chinese branch of the Naqshbandi order
- Other names: Ibrāhīm (إبراهيم), Ibrāhīm Wiqāyatullāh (إبراهيم وقاية الله), ʿAzīz (عزيز), Muhammad Amīn (محمد أمين), Ma Mingqing (馬明清), Ma Mingxin (馬明新), Wiqāyatullāh (وقاية الله), Dàozǔ Tàiyé (道祖太爷)
- Occupation: Sufi master, Islamic scholar, religious reformer

Religious life
- Religion: Islam
- Denomination: Sunni
- Order: Jahriyya
- Lineage: Naqshbandiyya
- Jurisprudence: Hanafi
- Movement: Jahriyya (New Teaching)

Muslim leader
- Teacher: ʿAbd al-Khāliq ibn Zayn al-Mizjājī, his paternal uncle (early religious instruction)
- Post: Founder and first shaykh of the Jahriyya
- Successor: Ma Hsian-ch'ang (Muhammad Zanbani Imam al-Alam)
- Influenced by: Ibrahim al-Kurani (through the Naqshbandi spiritual lineage), Muhammad Hayat al-Sindi, Shah Waliullah, ʿAbd al-Khāliq ibn Zayn al-Mizjājī
- Influenced: Jahriyya, Su Sishisan, Tian Wu, Ma Hualong (as a later spiritual successor in the Jahriyya lineage)

Ma Mingxin (1719–1781) (simplified Chinese: 马明心、马明新; traditional Chinese: 馬明心、馬明新; pinyin: Mǎ Míngxīn; Wade–Giles: Ma Ming-hsin) was a Chinese Sufi master, the founder of the Jahriyya menhuan (Naqshbandi Sufi order).

== Names ==
Ma Mingxin's Arabic given name was Ibrāhīm. After returning to China from Arabia he started calling himself 'Azīz.

He was also called Muhammad Emin (Arabic: محمد أمين). Followers of the Jahriyyah sometimes refer to him by the title of Wiqāyatullāh (Arabic: وقاية الله)

== Life ==
A Chinese-speaking Muslim from Gansu, Ma Mingxin spent 16 years studying in Mecca and Yemen. He was a disciple of a Naqshbandi Sufi teacher named 'Abd al-Khāliq, who was a son of az-Zayn b. Muhammad 'Abd al-Baqī al-Mizjaji (1643/44-1725), originally of Mizjaja near Zabīd, Yemen. Az-Zayn, in his turn, had studied in Medina under the famous Kurdish mystic Ibrahīm ibn Hasan al-Kūrānī (1616–1690), who was known for advocating the vocal (rather than silent) dhikr (invocation of the name of God).

After returning to China in 1761, Ma Mingxin founded the Jahriyya menhuan (order) (哲合忍耶; Zhéhérěnyē), the second Naqshbandi order in China after Ma Laichi's Khufiyya. In opposition to the "silent" Khufiyya Sufis, and following al-Kurani's teaching, Jahriyya adherents advocated vocal dhikr, which is reflected in the name of their school (from Arabic jahr, "aloud"). Ma Mingxin also opposed the emphasis that the Khufiyya members placed of the veneration of the saints, construction of grandiose elaborately decorated mosques, and the enrichment of religious leaders at the expense of their adherents.

By the early 1780s, Ma Mingxin's Jahriyya had spread over much of the then province of Gansu (which at the time also included today's Qinghai and Ningxia), as had the late Ma Laichi's Khufiyya menhuan. Theological arguments between members of the two menhuans, as well as the orders' claim on members' contributions, against the background of government mismanagement of the provincial revenue, often resulted in both violent conflicts and lawsuits.

The escalating conflict between the adherents of the two movements eventually attracted attention of the Qing government in 1781. The apparent center of the conflict at the time was in the ethnic Salar community of Xunhua County (in today's Qinghai Province, just west of today's Gansu's Linxia Prefecture). Considering the Jahriyya (dubbed by the government The New Teaching, in opposition to the "Old Teaching", i.e. the Khfiyya and the non-Sufi (gedimu) Muslims) subversive, the authorities had Ma Mingxin arrested, even though he wasn't personally anywhere around Xunhua at the moment.

While Ma Mingxin was kept in Lanzhou during the Jahriyya revolt, a government expedition sent to Xunhua to take care of the Jahriyya business was destroyed by the Jahriyya Salars, who then rushed across the today's Linxia Prefecture and to the walls of Lanzhou. When the besieged officials brought Ma Mingxin, wearing chains, to the city wall, to show him to the rebels, the Salars at once showed respect and devotion to their imprisoned leaders. Scared officials took Ma down from the wall, and beheaded him right away.

Ma Mingxin's widow, whose surname was Zhang (originally, from Gansu's Tongwei County), and his daughters were exiled to Xinjiang.

== Legacy ==
Ma Mingxin's death did not stop conflicts with China's Muslim

community, or those between the Muslims and the government. Three years after the death of Ma Mingxin, his follower Tian Wu started a rebellion against the imperial government; after its defeat, the authorities remained on lookout against the spread of the "subversive" Jahriyya teachings.

Ma Mingxin's fifth generation descendant and the then leader of Jahriyya, Ma Hualong, was one of the chief leaders of the Great Northwest Hui Rebellion in Ningxia, Shaanxi, and Gansu in the 1860s.

The Jahriyya order continues to this day, even if in more covert forms. In remembrance of Ma Mingxin, whose beard was shorn by government soldiers before his execution, many Jahriyya members shave the sides of their beards.

In 1985, over 20,000 Chinese Muslims assembled at the site of Ma Mingxin's original (destroyed) tomb near Lanzhou for a commemoration ceremony. The tomb has since been rebuilt.

Ma Mingxin's descendant was Ma Yuanzhang.

Ma Shaowu was a fourth generation descendant of Ma Mingxin, and Ma Shaowu's uncle Ma Yuanzhang was also a descendant, as was Ma Shaowu's great uncle Ma Shenglin 马圣鳞. Ma Shaowu's son Ma Cho-ya is a fifth generation descendant and he currently lives in Urumqi.
