= Zhang Chengzhi =

Hui Chinese writer

- 张承志
- Born: 10 September 1948 (age 77); Beijing, China
- Occupation: Writer
- Writing career
- Period: 1978 – present
- Notable work: History of the Soul

Zhang Chengzhi (Xiao'erjing: ﺟْﺎ ﭼْﻊ جِ, born 10 September 1948) is a contemporary Hui Chinese author. Often named as the most influential Muslim writer in China, his historical narrative History of the Soul, about the rise of the Jahriyya (哲合忍耶) Sufi order, was the second-most popular book in China in 1994.

== Biography ==
Zhang was born in Beijing in 1948 to Hui parents of Shandong origin. Despite his Muslim ancestry, he was raised as an atheist. He graduated from Tsinghua University Middle School in 1967, at the height of the Cultural Revolution. According to the People's Daily, Zhang was the first person to call himself a "Red Guard"; he used it as his pen name during his student days. Then on May 29, 1966, just two weeks after the People's Daily announced the beginning of the Cultural Revolution, Zhang convinced around ten other senior-level students to use the collective name "Mao Zedong's Red Guards" in addition to their individual signatures when signing a big-character poster denouncing their school officials; three days later, they issued another large-character poster under the same collective name, entitled "We Must Resolutely Carry Out the Great Proletarian Cultural Revolution to its End", with over one hundred signatures. Soon, students from all over Beijing began to call themselves "Red Guards".

After his graduation, Zhang was "sent down" to Ujimqin Banner in Xilin Gol League, Inner Mongolia, where he lived for four years before returning to Beijing. Soon after his return, he entered the archaeology department of Peking University, graduating in 1975. He began his writing career in 1978, with the publication of a poem in Mongolian entitled "Son of the People" (做人民之子/Arad-un-huu) and a Chinese-language short story "Why does the rider sing?" (骑手为什么歌唱). That same year, he entered a master's program in history at the Chinese Academy of Social Sciences's Department of Minority Languages, from which he graduated in 1981. In 1983, he received funding to go to Japan as an international exchange scholar, where he conducted research at Tokyo's Tōyō Bunko, the largest Asian studies library in Japan. Aside from Chinese and Mongolian, Zhang also speaks Japanese.

Zhang noted that during the Second Sino-Japanese War, Hui Muslims were suspicious of the intentions of Japanese researchers and deliberately concealed important religious information from them when interviewed.

== Literary career ==
Zhang is often identified as a representative of the so-called xungen movement ("searching for roots"), despite the fact that he himself dismisses entire concept of xungen. His work repeatedly touches on the themes of martyrdom, everlasting tradition, and resistance to materialism and urban life. Unlike many other authors who lived through the Cultural Revolution and regret the chaos it created in their lives, even Zhang's early works such as Rivers of the North and Black Steed exhibit a noticeable level of idealism about his time as a Red Guard, and clearly demonstrate his desire to rebut the presumptions of scar literature. Analyses of Zhang's impact on Chinese literature and thought vary greatly. Zhu Xueqin expressed his admiration of Zhang for "casting off his old self" and taking a "firm stand" for idealistic values and against ethnocentrism. Dru Gladney, in contrast, analysed Zhang's popularity in terms of a larger trend of consumerist exoticisation of "ethnic chic" in 1990s China. Some scholars, both in China and abroad, go further in rendering harsh judgments: they denounce Zhang as "xenophobic" and criticise his continued support of Maoism even after his conversion to Islam.

The early 1980s have been described as Zhang's "lyrical phase". As a result of his works during this period, he has been described as one of China's first practitioners of "stream of consciousness" fiction. In 1984, however, Zhang quit his job at the China Writers' Association and moved to China's Northwest, spending six years living with the Muslims of Xihaigu, Ningxia. His time there resulted not only in his conversion to Islam and, in one critic's words, his "open renunciation of Chinese culture", but also in what is easily his most famous book: History of the Soul, a work of narrative historical fiction which explores personal and religious conflicts during 172 years of development of the Jahriyya tariqah in China's northwest, interwoven with his own observations.

== Works ==
- 黑骏马 (Hēi Jùnmă/The Black Steed); 1981
  - English edition: The Black Steed; 1990, Panda Books, United States. ISBN 0-8351-2077-5. Translator: Stephen Fleming.
  - Japanese edition: 黒駿馬, 1994, Waseda University Press, Japan. ISBN 4-657-93036-2. Translator: 岸 陽子.
  - French edition: Mon beau cheval noir; 1999, Philippe Picquier, France. ISBN 2-87730-435-3. Translator: Dong Qiang (董强).
  - Movie adaptation A Mongolian Tale released in 1995 by Beijing Youth Film Studio
- 北方的河 (Bĕifāng de Hé/Rivers of the North); 1984
  - Japanese edition: 北方の河, 1997, Romandō. ISBN 4-7952-1042-X. Translator: 磯部 祐子
- 金牧场 (Jīn Mùchăng/Golden Pastures); October 1987
- 心灵史 (Xīnlíng Shĭ/History of the Soul); January 1991
- 回教から見た中国―民族・宗教・国家 (Kaikyōkara mita Chūgoku: Minzoku, Shūkyō Kokka/An Islamic view of China: Ethnicity, Religion, Nation); April 1993, Chūō Kōbunsha. In Japanese. ISBN 4-12-101128-7.
- 清洁的精神 (Qīngjié de jīngshén/A Clean Spirit); 1994
- 鞍と筆―中国知識人の道とは何か (Saddles and pens: The path of China's intellectuals), November 1995, Ohta Books. In Japanese. ISBN 4-87233-226-1.
- 五色的异端 (Wŭ Sè de Yìduān/Five Colors of Heresy); 2007
  - First edition: Hong Kong: Da feng chu ban she. ISBN 9789889972578.

== See also ==
- Islam in China
- Naqshbandi, a Sufi order that had a large influence on Jahriyya thought and practise
