= History of the Soul =

1991 Chinese history book

History of the soul
- Cover of the 1995 edition of History of the Soul, depicting the deserts of China's Northwest
- Author: Zhang Chengzhi
- Original title: 心灵史 (Xīnlíng Shĭ)
- Language: Chinese
- Genre: Narrative history
- Publisher: Huacheng Publishing House
- Publication date: 1991
- Publication place: People's Republic of China
- Media type: Book
- Pages: 298
- Preceded by: Golden Pastures (金牧场)
- Followed by: 红卫兵の时代

History of the Soul, written by Zhang Chengzhi, is a work of narrative history spanning 172 years, which explores the personal and religious conflicts among the Jahriyya, a Sufi tariqah in Northwestern China. Published in 1991, it went on to become China's second-best selling book in 1994.

== Plot summary ==
The book is divided into seven chapters or "gates", each corresponding to one of the seven generations of the masters, martyrs, and common people of the Jahriyya Order.

- Chapter 1: The Scarlet Green Banner (红色绿旗)
- Chapter 2: The True Vanishing (真实的隐没)
- Chapter 3: Exile (流放)
- Chapter 4: A New World (新世界)
- Chapter 5: The Beauty of Martyrdom (牺牲之美)
- Chapter 6: Disgraced (被侮辱的)
- Chapter 7: Knocking on Modernity's Gate (叩开现代的大门)

== Editions ==
- First edition: 心灵史, People's Republic of China: Huacheng Publishing House, January 1991.
- 1995 edition: 张承志文学作品选集:心灵史卷, People's Republic of China: Hainan Publishing House, August 1995. ISBN 7-80617-536-9.
- Traditional Chinese edition: 心靈史──揭開哲合忍耶的聖域之謎, Republic of China (Taiwan): Fengyun Shidai, January 1997. ISBN 957-645-803-X.
- 1999 edition: 张承志著.心灵史 长篇小说卷[M].长沙：湖南文艺出版社.1999. ISBN 7-5404-2216-5.
