= Ma Laichi =

Chinese Sufi Muslim

- 馬來遲 / 马来迟
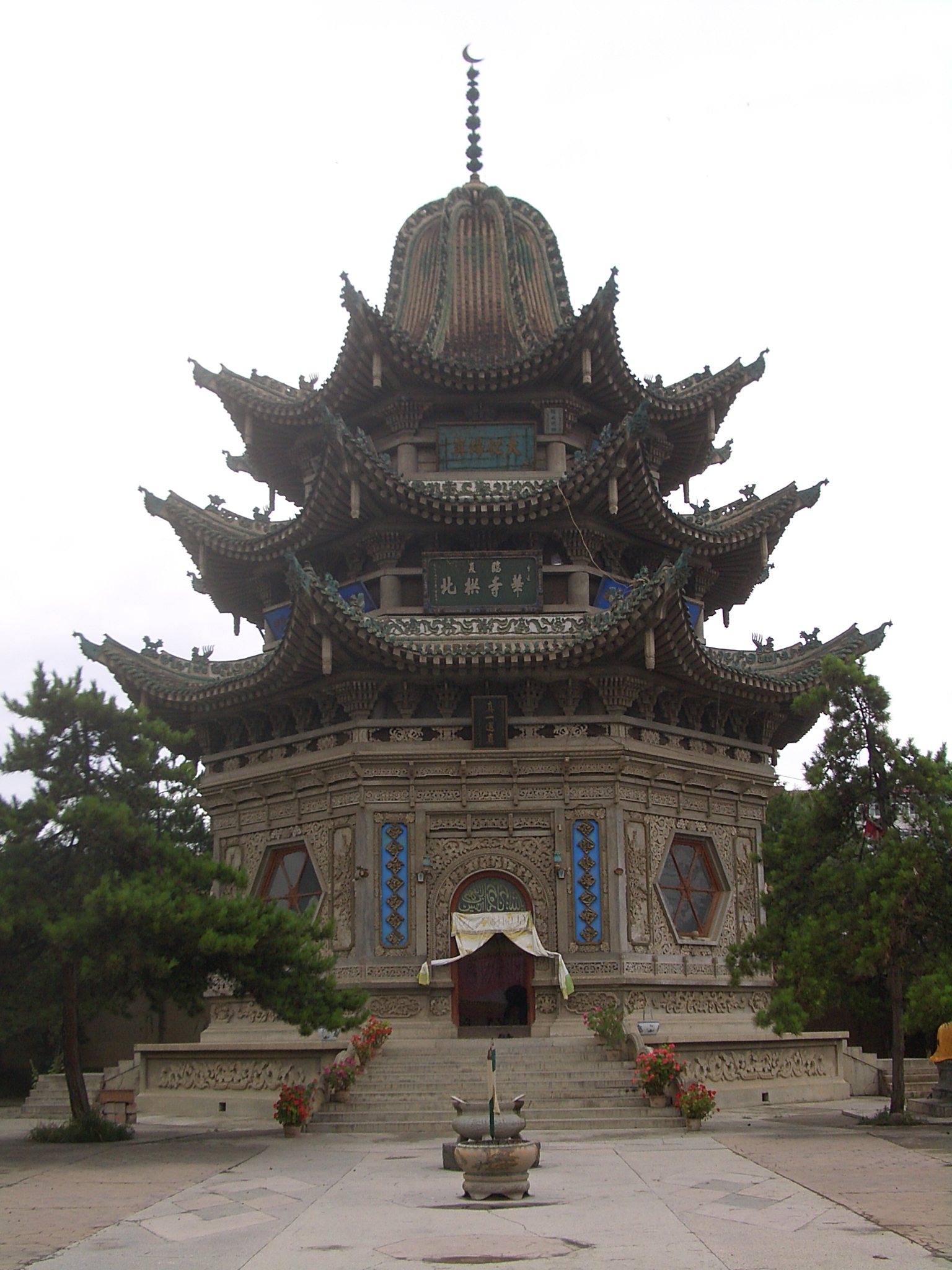
- Hua Si Gongbei, the mausoleum complex associated with Ma Laichi in Linxia City

Personal life
- Born: 1681? Hezhou (present-day Linxia City, Gansu, Qing China)
- Died: 1766? Hezhou, Gansu, Qing China
- Resting place: Hua Si Gongbei, Linxia City, Gansu, China
- Children: Ma Guobao
- Parent: Ma Jiajun (also rendered Ma Jiujun)
- Era: 17th–18th centuries
- Region: Northwest China, especially Gansu and Qinghai
- Main interest(s): Sufism, Naqshbandi spirituality, dhikr, Islamic religious instruction
- Education: Islamic school at Milagou under Ma Tai Baba; Quranic studies, Islamic jurisprudence, Sufi teachings, advanced religious studies in Mecca and Yemen
- Known for: Establishing the Hua Si menhuan and introducing the Khufiyya branch of the Naqshbandi Order into northwestern China
- Other names: Abu al-Futūḥ Ma Laichi, ʿAbd al-Ḥalīm (religious name), Ma Lai-chih (Wade–Giles), Dàozǔ Tàiyé (道祖太爷)
- Occupation: Sufi shaykh, Islamic scholar, religious teacher

Religious life
- Religion: Islam
- Denomination: Sunni
- Order: Naqshbandiyya
- School: Khufiyya
- Jurisprudence: Hanafi

Muslim leader
- Influenced by: Afaq Khoja, Ma Tai Baba, Muhammad b. Ahmad b. ʿAqila al-Makki al-Hanafi, Mawlana Makhdum
- Influenced: Hua Si Khufiyya, Ma Guobao, Ma Wuyi, Hui and Salar Muslim communities in Gansu and Qinghai

Ma Laichi (1681? – 1766?; simplified Chinese: 马来迟; traditional Chinese: 馬來遲; pinyin: Mǎ Láichí; Wade–Giles: Ma Lai-chih), also known as Abu 'l-Futūh Ma Laichi, was a Chinese Sufi master who brought the Khufiyya movement to China and created the Huasi menhuan (Sufi order), the earliest and most important Naqshbandi (نقشبندية，納克什班迪) order in Chinese Muslim history.

== Life ==
=== Afaq Khoja's blessing ===
Ma Laichi came from a Chinese Muslim family with a military background. His grandfather, Ma Congshan, was a general under the Ming dynasty; his father, Ma Jiujun, passed imperial examinations on the military track under the Qing, but instead of joining government service, made a fortune in business. His home was in Hezhou (now called Linxia), one of the main Muslim centers of Gansu.

According to the legend told by Ma Laichi's followers, Ma Jiajun was still childless at the age of forty, and, desirous to have a son, he went to Xining, to ask for a blessing from Afaq Khoja, a Naqshbandi shaykh visiting from Kashgar, and a reputed miracle worker. After reciting some prayers, the Kashgarian Sufi master told Ma Jiajun to go back to Hezhou and to marry a certain non-Muslim woman, who had previously been engaged a number of times, but every time her fiancé died before the wedding. Ma Jiajun indeed married that 26-year-old woman, and they had a son. Soon after, all Ma Jiajun's property was destroyed by a fire, and he named his son "Laichi", meaning "[one who] came too late".

Rendered destitute by the fire, Ma Jiajun became a tea peddler, travelling in the region between Hezhou and Xining. His boy, meanwhile, studied at the Koranic school run by Khoja Afaq's disciple Ma Tai Baba (马太爸爸, "The Great Father Ma", 1632–1709) in the nearby Milagou (米拉沟). (apparently, within today's Minhe Hui and Tu Autonomous County).

Tai Baba's top student, Ma Laichi had learned everything the school had to offer by the age of 18. Tai Baba ordained the young Ma as an ahong and initiated him into Sufism, passing onto him the barakah that he had received from Afaq Khoja.

=== The great Hajj ===
According to Ma Tong's chronology of Ma Laichi's life, after 30 years of religious work in the Hezhou region, Ma Laichi left China in 1728 for a Hajj to Islam's holy places in the Middle East. In 1728-1733 he studied under a number of Sufi masters in the Arab World (primarily in Mecca and Yemen; some versions of his biography also mention Cairo and Damascus). Due to the scarcity and imprecision of existing Chinese and Arabic sources, different researchers have come up with different versions and dates for Ma Laichi's great Hajj: the standard Chinese account by Ma Tong tells of Ma sailing to Arabia from Guangzhou (after studying for 3 months with a famous ahong there), and coming back by the sea route as well; other accounts have him traveling to the west by land, via Central Asia, and studying for a while in Bukhara. In Mecca, his teacher was the head of the Khafiya zawiya (Islamic school) there, Muhammad Jibuni Ahmad Agelai (or Ajilai, in other accounts).

Another teacher who influenced him greatly was Mawlana Makhdum, who gave Ma Laichi the name Abu 'l-Futūh. Little is known about Makhdum, but Joseph Fletcher surmised that he may have been an Indian.

=== The Khufiyya ===
After returning to China, Ma Laichi established the Hua Si (华寺; "Multicolored Mosque") school (menhuan) - the core of the Khufiyya (الخفية) 虎夫耶 movement in Chinese Islam. The name of the movement - a Chinese form of the Arabic "Khafiyya", i.e. "the silent ones" - refers to its adherents' emphasis on silent dhikr (invocation of God's name). The Khufiyya teachings were characterized by stronger participation in the society, as well as veneration of saints and seeking inspiration at their tombs.

Ma Laichi spent 32 years spreading his teaching among the Muslim Hui and Salar people in Gansu and Qinghai. He also converted to Islam numerous Tibetan, Mongol, and Monguor-speaking communities in Qinghai, sometimes after winning a religious debate with a local "Living Buddha". Some of these communities still belong to the Khufiyya, and their members still revere Ma Laichi as the saint who brought their ancestors into Islam.

== Death ==
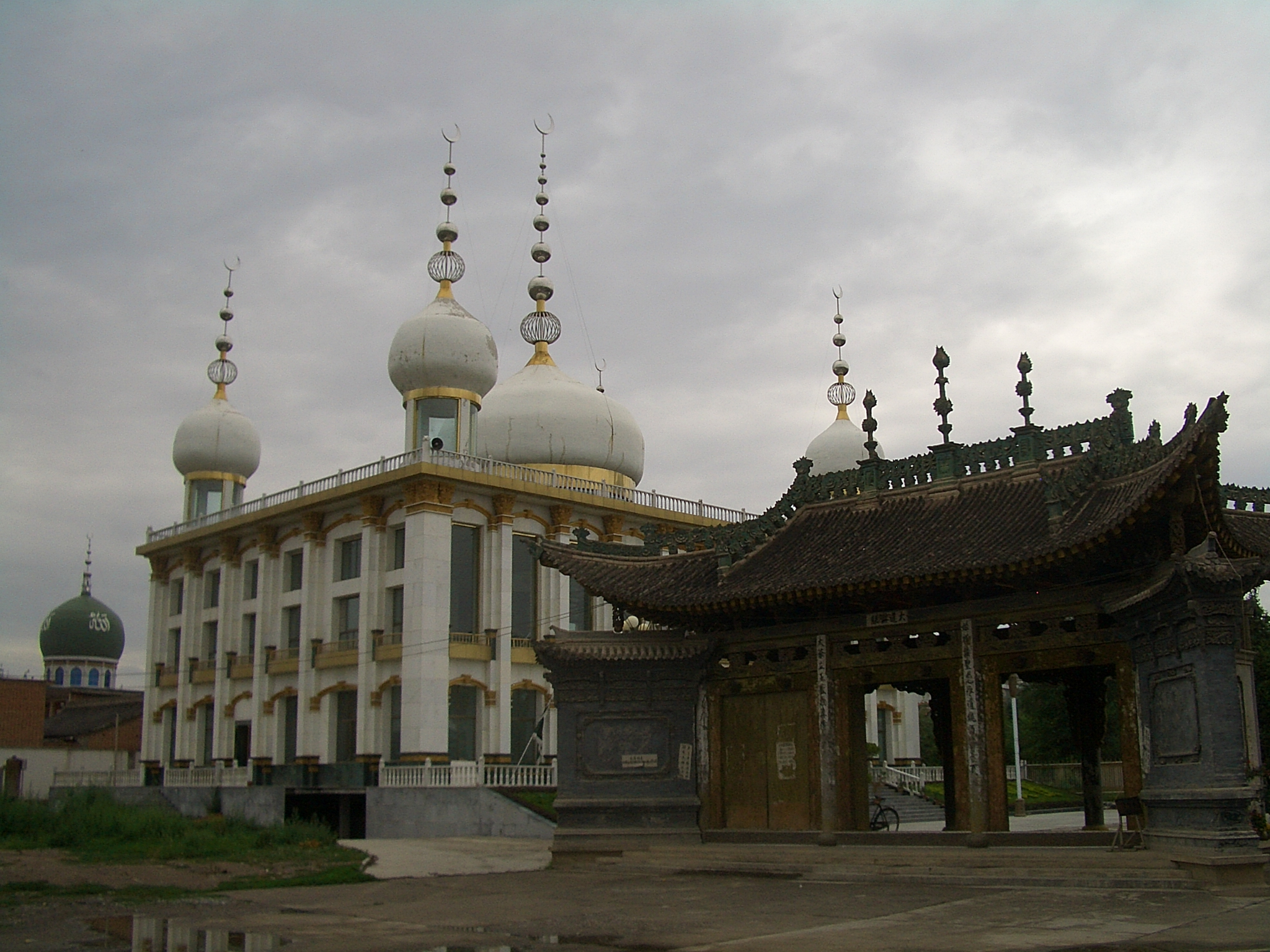
On the grounds of Hua Si Gongbei

After the death of Ma Laichi, his position as the leader of the Khufiyya was inherited by his son, Ma Guobao - an act that came to be strongly criticized by the founder of the competing Jahriyya menhuan, Ma Mingxin. Ma Guobao was later succeeded by Ma Wuyi.

Ma Laichi's grave in Linxia City was restored in 1986. The shrine complex, which includes a mosque and is known as Hua Si Gongbei (华寺拱北), continues to be the center of the Hua Si Khufiyya menhuan.

== Literature ==
- Gladney, Dru C. (1996). Muslim Chinese: ethnic nationalism in the People's Republic. Volume 149 of Harvard East Asian monographs (2 ed.). Harvard Univ Asia Center. ISBN 0-674-59497-5. (First edition appeared in 1991).
- Lipman, Jonathan Neaman (1998). Familiar strangers: a history of Muslims in Northwest China. Hong Kong University Press. ISBN 962-209-468-6.
- Weismann, Itzchak (2007). The Naqshbandiyya: orthodoxy and activism in a worldwide Sufi tradition. Volume 8 of Routledge Sufi series. Routledge. ISBN 978-0-415-32243-0.

== See also ==
- List of Sufi saints
- List of Sufis
