= Lingzhou =

Lingzhou may refer to:

- 菱洲 - a famous park in Nanjing (pronounced the same as 灵州)
- 灵洲山 - a mountain in Guangdong, China
- 灵州 - the old name of Lingwu, China
