= Khufiyya =

Sufist order of Chinese Islam

Khufiyya (Arabic: الخفية, romanized: Khufiyya or Khafiyya, lit. 'the silent ones'; borrowed as Chinese: 虎夫耶; pinyin: Hǔfūyé) is a tariqa (Sufi order) of Chinese Islam. It was the first tariqa to be established in China and, along with the Jahriyya, Qadiriyya, and Kubrawiyyah, is acknowledged as one of the four orders of Chinese Sufism.

Khufis dwell mainly in Northwest China, especially Gansu. The order follows the Hanafi school in terms of jurisprudence. Traditional beliefs within the order claim the originator of Khufiyya to be Abu Bakr. In addition, the doctrines of Khufiyya are influenced by a Confucian approach to expounding Muslim sacred texts known as Yiru Quanjing (Chinese: 以儒詮經).

== History ==
The origin of Khufiyya can be traced to the Naqshbandis of Central Asia, a Sunni spiritual order of Sufism, which in turn has its roots in Sham. Their missions gave rise to the prosperity of Sufis in Bukhara and Samarkand. Makhdumi Azam, a 17th-century Naqshbandi leader, settled in Kashgar where his offspring promoted and cemented his teachings. Descendants of Azam were known as Miskiya and Ishaqis.

Khufiyya in China was pioneered by a Ming dynasty mufti from Lintao County named Ma Shouzhen (馬守貞). He was born in 1633 during the reign of the Chongzhen Emperor. In his youth, he was mentored by the Miskiya missionary Afaq Khoja, who visited Hezhou in 1672 and greatly contributed to the dissemination of Sufism in China. At the age of 40, Shouzhen began his preaching. After 50 years, the order had grown into a sizable religious community.

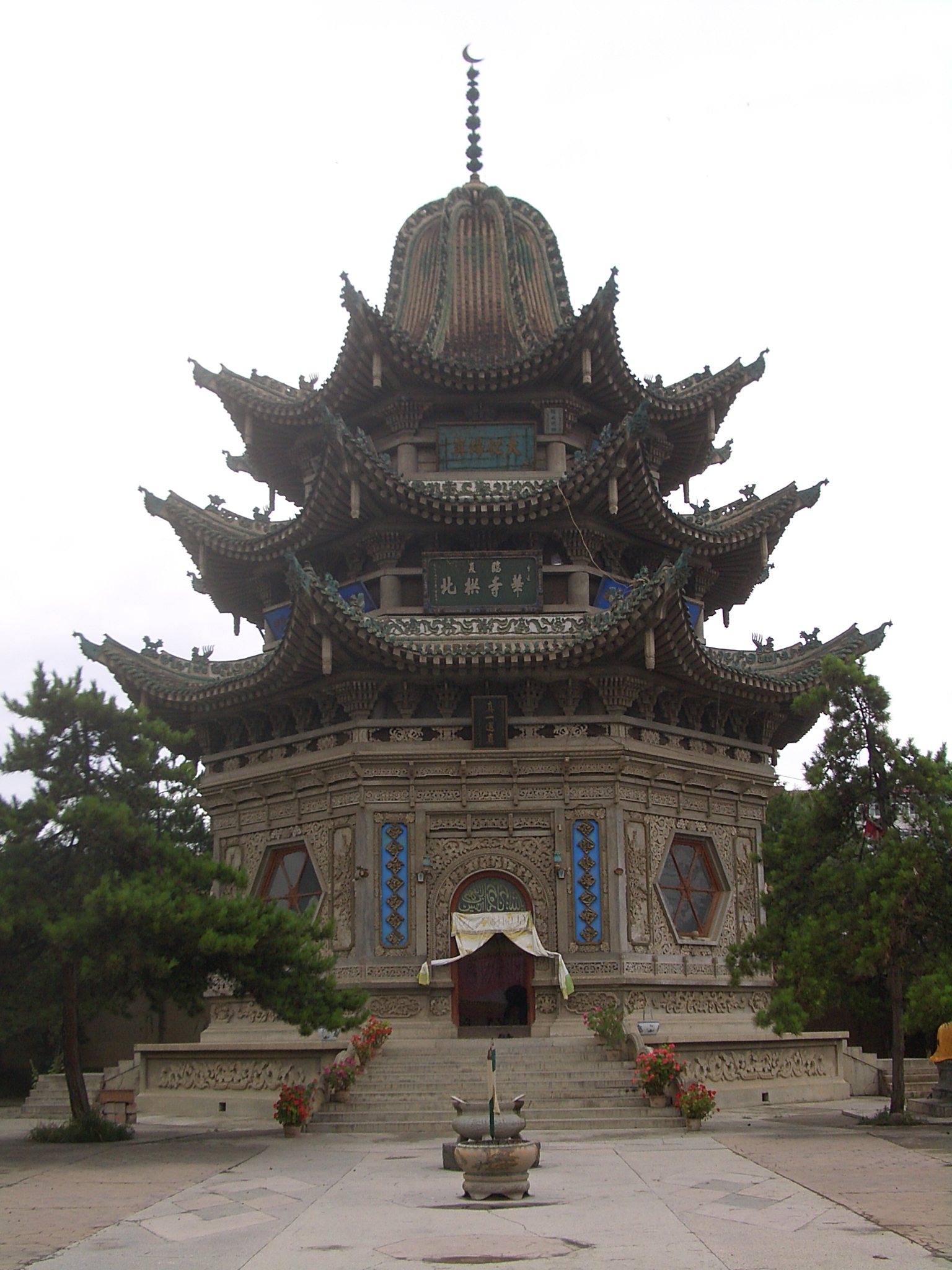
Mausoleum of Ma Laichi, Linxia City, Gansu, China

Ma Laichi can be seen as another founding member of the Khufiyya order. Under the guidance of Ma Taibaba, a contemporary of Ma Shouzhen, Ma Laichi was introduced to Sufism. After his Hajj, he returned to China and preached for 32 years in Qinghai and Gansu. He later established the Huasi Menhuan, which remains an important menhuan or denomination of Chinese Sufism.

In the early 18th century, Xian Meizhen, another pupil of Afaq Khoja, preached in the inner provinces of China. The Xianmen Menhuan denomination was founded by Meizhen. Gradually, over years of religious practice and conversion, different denominations of Khufiyya formed Jiaofang (教坊)–units of residence where followers of a menhuan reside. Just like those of Jahriyya, Khufiyyan Jiaofang were organized administrative divisions led by an akhund.

Throughout the reign of the Qianlong Emperor of the Qing dynasty, the "old" orders of Chinese Sufism represented by Khufiyya encountered a wave of reformists led by Ma Mingxin, the founder of Jahriyya which was known as the "New order". Ma Mingxing opposed and criticized Khufiyyan menhuan's hereditary lineage and attracted followers from Gansu, Ningxia, and Qinghai. In the later conflicts between Khufiyya and Jahriyya over both religious and political affairs, the Qing government supported Khufiyya and saw Jahriyya as a threat to its rule.

During the Cultural Revolution, Khufiyya was among the many religious organizations that suffered persecutions and pressures. Many mosques were demolished during this time, religious practice was forbidden. The state-imposed ban on religion was lifted after 3rd plenary session of the 11th Central Committee of the Chinese Communist Party. In contemporary China, followers of Khufiyya live mainly in Linxia, Tianshui and Lanzhou of Gansu province.

== Philosophy ==
Like other Sufi orders, Khufiyya is characterized by the veneration of Muslim saints, the search for enlightenment, and dhikr (quiet repetition of devotional phrases or prayers). The dhikr of Khufiyya followers are in a low tone or even silent, which references the meaning of the name Khufiyya, "the silent" or "the concealed/hidden". In addition, Khufiyya was relatively conformist to the central government of China throughout different periods of history.

The Khufiyya order rejects the excessive practice of abstinence from worldly desires. It advocates for a way of spiritual life which balances between one's secular affairs and spiritual endeavors.

Disciples of the Khufiyya order are required to complete the reading of the Quran and Hadiths. Notably, reciting silent dhikr is a necessity. A teacher of Khufiyya disciples is known as a murshid.

== Demography ==
As of 1988, out of 6,781,500 Hui people, it was estimated that 7.2% were Khufiyya followers. In Ningxia, there were 560 mosques affiliated with Khufiyya. Adherents of Khufiyya can be found in most of the northwestern provinces of China, with settlements in the inner provinces of Yunnan, Sichuan, Henan, Jilin and Hebei.

== Menhuan ==
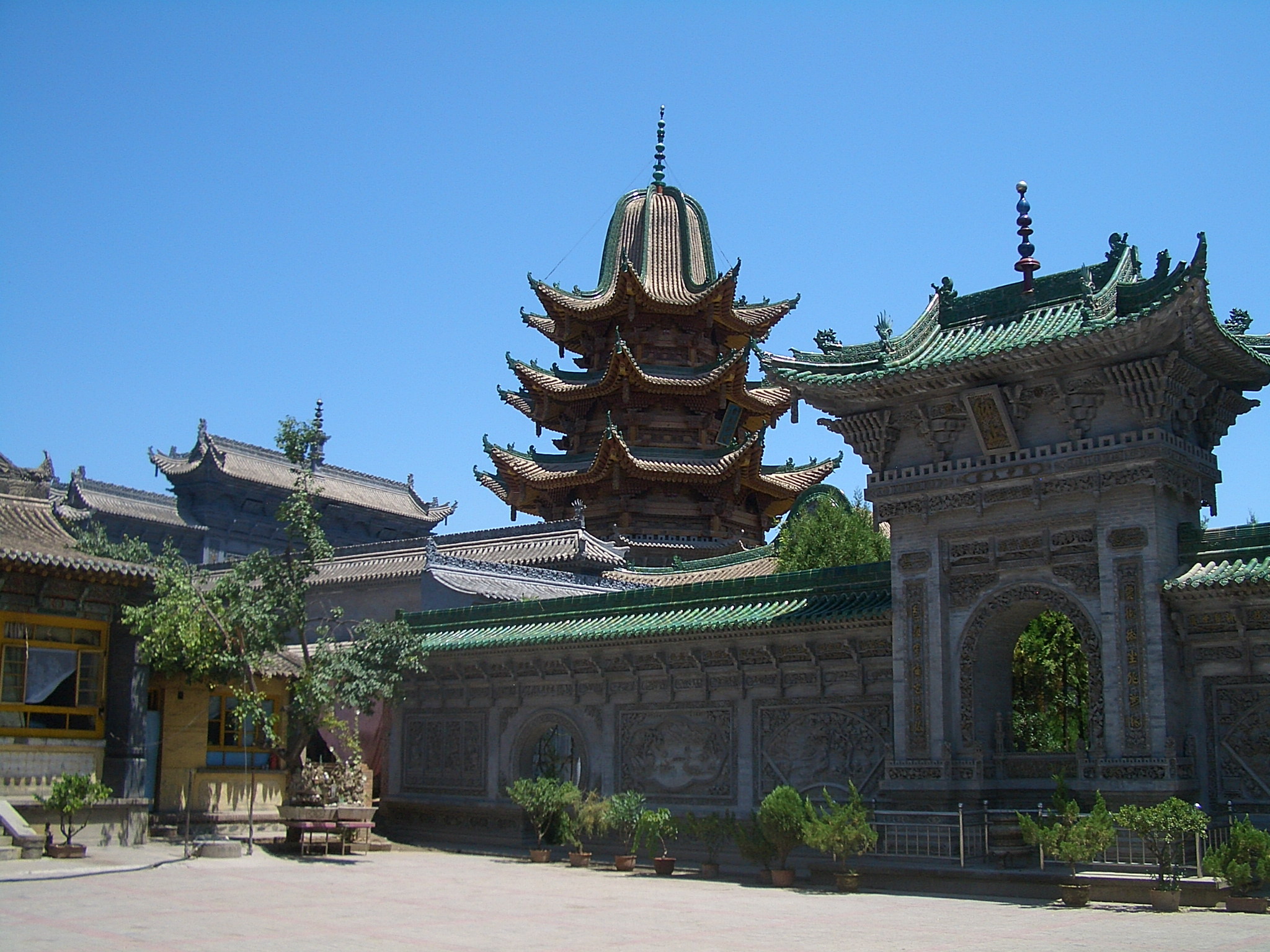
Yu Baba Gongbei in Linxia

There are more than 20 menhuan (denominations). The following list shows some of the major menhuans of the Khufiyya brotherhood:

- Huasi Menhuan
- Lintao Menhuan
- Beizhuang Menhuan, Basuchi Menhuan, and Jinggou Menhuan
- Mingyuetang
- Humen Menhuan
- Xianmen Menhuan
- Hongmen Menhuan
- Wenquantang and Tonggui Menhuan
- Gaozhaojia Menhuan
- Salar
- Famen Menhuan
- Dingmen Menhuan

== See also ==
- List of Sufi orders
- Han Kitab
