= Jahriyya =

Sufi order in China

Chinese name
- Chinese: 哲赫林耶
Transcriptions
Standard Mandarin
- Hanyu Pinyin: Zhéhèlínyē
other Mandarin
- Xiao'erjing: جْحْلٍاِئ

Alternative Chinese name
- Chinese: 哲合忍耶
Transcriptions
Standard Mandarin
- Hanyu Pinyin: Zhéhérěnyē
other Mandarin
- Xiao'erjing: جْحْژٍاِئ

Arabic name
- Arabic: جهرية

Jahriyya (also spelled Jahrīya or Jahriyah) is a menhuan (Sufi order) in China, commonly called the New Teaching (Xinjiao). Founded in the 1760s by Ma Mingxin, it was active in the late 18th and 19th centuries in what was then Gansu Province (also including parts of today's Qinghai and Ningxia), when its followers were involved in a number of conflicts with other Muslim groups and in several rebellions against China's ruling Qing dynasty.

The name comes from the Arabic word jahr (جهر), referring to their practice of vocally performing the dhikr (invocation of the name of God). This contrasted with the more typical Naqshbandi practice of performing it silently, as observed by the Khufiyya or Old Teaching.

== History ==
=== Foundation and principles ===
The Jahriya order was founded by the Gansu Chinese-speaking Muslim scholar Ma Mingxin soon after his return to China in 1761, after 16 years of studying in Mecca and Yemen. He had studied there under a Naqshbandi Sufi teacher named 'Abd al-Khāliq (known to the Chinese Muslims as "Abu Duha Halik"), who was a son of az-Zayn b. Muhammad 'Abd al-Baqī al-Mizjaji (1643/44–1725), originally from Mizjaja near Zabīd, Yemen. Az-Zayn, in turn, had studied in Medina under the famous Kurdish mystic Ibrahīm ibn Hasan al-Kūrānī (1616–1690), who was known for advocating the vocal (rather than silent) dhikr. Al-Kurani also taught the scholar Muhammed Hayat al-Sindhi who was one of the teachers of Muhammed bin Abdul Wahhab.

Ma Mingxin's Jahriyya menhuan (order) was the second Naqshbandi order in China after Ma Laichi's Khufiyya. Unlike the "silent" Khufiyya Sufis and following al-Kurani's teaching, Jahriyya adherents advocated vocal dhikr, which is reflected in the name of their school (from Arabic jahr, "aloud"). Ma Mingxin also did not agree with the emphasis that the Khufiyya members placed of the veneration of the saints, construction of grandiose elaborately decorated mosques and the enrichment of religious leaders at the expense of their adherents.

"The Saw"(منشار) (Minšār) (明沙了 Mingshale "Shining Sand") was an 18th-century Jahriyya text.

=== The early Jahriyya-Khufiyya conflict, the Salar Revolt of 1781 and the death of Ma Mingxin ===
By the early 1780s, the Jahriyya movement had spread over much of the then province of Gansu (which at the time also included today's Qinghai and Ningxia), as had the late Ma Laichi's Khufiyya menhuan. Theological arguments between members of the two menhuans, as well as the orders' claim on members' contributions, against the background of government mismanagement of the provincial revenue, often resulted in both violent conflicts and lawsuits.

The escalating conflict between the adherents of the two movements eventually attracted attention of the Qing government in 1781. The apparent center of the conflict at the time was in the ethnic Salar community of Xunhua County (in today's Qinghai Province, just west of today's Gansu's Linxia Prefecture). Considering the Jahriyya (dubbed by the government The New Teaching, in opposition to the "Old Teaching", i.e. the Khfiyya and the non-Sufi (gedimu) Muslims) subversive, the authorities had Ma Mingxin arrested, even though he wasn't personally anywhere around Xunhua at the moment.

While Ma Mingxin was kept in Lanzhou, the Hezhou adjutant general Xinzhu and the prefect of Lanzhou Yang Shiji went to Xunhua with a small military detachment to take care of the Jahriyya business. The Jahriyya Salars sent a "welcoming party" to meet them, led by the ahong (imam) nicknamed Su Sishisan ("Su Forty-three", 苏四十三). Having met the government expedition at the place called Baizhuangzi, Su's people first pretended to be the friendly "Old Teaching" Muslims, but once they'd learned about the purpose of the government expedition, they pulled out their weapons, overpowered the government soldiers, and killed both Qing officials. This action immediately made the Jahriya Salars not just "subversives" but outright rebels in the eyes of the government.

While openly confronting the government was obviously a suicidal act for Su's followers, modern researchers [Lipman (1998, p. 108)] surmise that they were motivated by the perceived threat of massacre against their menhuan.

After destroying the government force at Baizhuangzi, Su's two thousand Salar fighters then rushed east, across the today's Linxia Prefecture and to the walls of Lanzhou; on the way, they had briefly besieged Hezhou and killed some "Old Teaching" followers there, to punish them for goading the government into anti-Jahriyya action.

When the besieged officials brought Ma Mingxin, wearing chains, to the Lanzhou city wall, to show him to the rebels, Su's Salars at once showed respect and devotion to their imprisoned leaders. Scared officials took Ma down from the wall, and beheaded him right away. Su's Salars tried attacking the Lanzhou city walls, but, not having any siege equipment, failed to penetrate into the walled city. The Salar fighters (whose strength at the time is estimated by historians to be in 1,000–2,000 range) then set up a fortified camp on a hill south of Lanzhou.

To deal with the rebels, Imperial Commissioners Agui and Heshen were sent to Lanzhou. Unable to dislodge the Salars from their fortified camp with his regular troops, Agui sent the "incompetent" Heshen back to Beijing, and recruited Alashan Mongols and Southern Gansu Tibetans to aid the Chinese Lanzhou garrison. After a three months' siege of the rebel camp and cutting off the Salars' water supply, Agui's joint forces destroyed the Jahriya rebels; Su and all his fighters were all killed in the final battle.

=== Government repression ===
The Jahriya was (known as "the New Teaching" to the Qing administrators of the time), was now a patently dangerous organization in the eyes of the authorities. In the aftermath of the Salar revolt, Ma Mingxin's widow, whose surname was Zhang (originally, from Gansu's Tongwei County), and his daughters were exiled to Xinjiang. It is stated elsewhere that "all his family" (excluding, presumably, his wife and daughters) were exiled to Yunnan. Other Jahriya adherents were captured and exiled as well. Occasionally, mistakes were made, when many non-Jahriyya Muslims (notably Ma Wuyi – the third leader of the "good" Khufiyya) were caught and sent to the southwest (Yunnan etc.) as well.

=== Early succession ===
During his life, Ma Mingxin strongly criticized the competing Khufiyya order for passing its leadership from the order's founder, Ma Laichi, to his son, Ma Guobao. Ma Mingxin himself chose his own successor as the head of the Jahriyya based on his Islamic scholarship and piety; later on, the third leader of the order was chosen in a similar way.

=== Tian Wu's rebellion (1784) ===
Ma Mingxin's death did not stop conflicts with China's Muslim community, or those between the Muslims and the government. Three years after the death of Ma Mingxin, a Jahriyya ahong (imam) named Tian Wu, started a rebellion against the imperial government. It was centered in the eastern part of the then Gansu Province (including Guyuan, which is within today's Ningxia) – a very different, Hui rather than Salar, region from the Xunhua County of the 1781 rebellion.

It took the Qing forces several months to quell Tian Wu's rebellion. As it happens too often during suppression of rebellions, many non-combatants perished as well; it is reported that Li Shiyao's forces executed over a thousand of women and children of in Jahriyya communities of Eastern Gansu. The Jahriyya was proscribed again, despite objections of some government officials (notably, one Fuk'anggan) who felt that a blanket prohibition would be counterproductive.

In view of modern historians, the suppression of Jahriyya was indeed counterproductive, since the dispersion of the order's throughout the country allowed them to widely popularize their idea among China's Muslims. It also increased the attractiveness of the now-underground order to all Muslims discontent with the government's policies.

This period was also characterized by the creation of Jahriyya literature. Written by the order's ahongs in Arabic and Persian, numerous miracle stories praised Ma Mingxin and his successors.

=== Relocation to Ningxia, and the Great Northwest Hui Rebellion ===
The nineteenth century brought significant changes to the Jahriyya. While the order's second and third leaders were selected primarily based on their abilities, the fourth shaikh, Ma Yide (late 1770s – 1849), who assumed the leadership position in 1817, was the son of the third. From this point on the leadership succession in the Jahriyya was usually on the hereditary principle, as it was common in menhuans in general.

Although the 18th-century Jahriyya was primarily based in central Gansu, by the mid-19th century the order's activity was centered in the northern Ningxia (which in the 19th century was also part of Gansu Province), its headquarters being located in Jinjipu (金积堡), a few kilometers south from today's Wuzhong City. Under the leadership of Ma Yide and his successor, the order's fifth shaikh Ma Hualong (d. 1871), the town of Jinjipu became an important religious and commercial center, and the menhuan's leaders grew wealthy thanks to the order's profitable participation in the caravan trade across Inner Mongolia, between Baotou, Huhhot and Beijing.

During the Great Northwest Hui Rebellion, which started in 1862, Ma Hualong's Jahriyya led the rebellion in the Jahriyya-heavy eastern parts of the 19th-century Gansu Province, i.e. today's Ningxia and easternmost sections of today's Gansu. While the rebels elsewhere within the 19th-century borders of Gansu had been primarily controlled by their own, essentially independent leaders – notably, Ma Zhan'ao in Hezhou (now Linxia), Ma Guiyuan in Xining, and Ma Wenlu in Suzhou (Jiuquan) – Jahriyya members participated in the rebellion throughout the region. Ma Guiyuan's sons were castrated after he was executed.

Ma was besieged in Jinjipu in July 1869 by the Qing forces led by General Zuo Zongtang. After fortifications outside of the town itself had been captured by the government troops, and starvation started inside the walls, Ma Hualong surrendered in January 1871, hoping to spare the lives of his people. However, once Zuo's troops entered Jinjipu, a massacre followed. Over a thousand people died, and the town was destroyed. According to most accounts, Ma Hualong himself was executed on Zuo's orders on March 2, 1871, along with his son Ma Yaobang and over eighty Jahriyya officials.

In the western section of the Yunnan Province, Jahriyya – brought there in the 18th century by exiles from Gansu, notably by the relatives of Ma Mingxin exiled there after the suppression of the rebellion 1781 – was active as well. One of the Jahriyya leaders in Yunnan was Ma Shilin, said to be a direct descendant of Ma Mingxin himself. Ma Shilin traveled twice to Ningxia, visiting Ma Hualong in Jinjipu, and when Du Wenxiu started the Panthay Rebellion in Yunnan, Ma Shillin became one Du's commanders. After defending the fortress of Donggouzhai for a year against the Qing forces, he chose to commit suicide rather than to become a prisoner of the Qing.

=== Restoration under Ma Yuanzhang ===
After the disaster of Jinjipu, and the death or capture of most of Ma Hualong's family, it became the task of Ma Shilin's son, Ma Yuanzhang (the 1850s – 1920) to restore the menhuan. Ma Yuanzhang and his brothers survived the destruction of the Jahriyya leadership in Ningxia and Yunnan because their fathers had sent them to Sichuan, away from the fighting. Now, when the dust settled, Ma Yuanzhang and his brothers, disguised as merchants, traveled to Gansu to assess the situation.

They discovered that two of Ma Hualong's grandsons, Ma Jincheng and Ma Jinxi, survived the disaster at Jinjipu. Imprisoned in Xi'an, the two boys were sentenced to be castrated upon reaching the age of 12. Too late to save the older boy from ending his days as a eunuch slave, Ma Yuanzhang managed to spirit away, intact, the younger one. This boy, Ma Jinxi, survived in hiding (with a Hui family in Hangzhou, and elsewhere), until, years later, Ma Yuanzhang managed to obtain a pardon for him.

Meanwhile, Ma Yuanzhang set himself up as a leather merchant. This allowed him to visit scattered Jahriyya communities all over eastern China, gaining the respect of the surviving members of the order. He married a female relative of Ma Malaichi, thus solidifying his claim of legitimate succession. After yet another Muslim rebellion Gansu – this time, triggered by factional strife within the Jahriyya's old rival, the Khufiyya order – blew up and was suppressed in 1895, Ma Yuanzhang returned to Gansu, and re-established the Jahriyya organization, now headquartered in Zhangjiachuan County – an area in eastern Gansu almost exclusively populated by the Hui refugees from Shaanxi, resettled there by Zuo Zongtang after the defeat of the Great Muslim Rebellion in the early 1870s.

However, the pardoned Ma Jinxi felt himself to be the more legitimate successor of Ma Hualong; so he set up a rival Jahriyya organization, based in northern Ningxia, not far from his grandfather's former Jinjipu headquarters. A split within the Jahriyya followed, with some members becoming followers of Ma Jinxi, and others holding for Ma Yuanzhang.

=== Later history ===
The Jahriyya order continues to this day, even if in more covert forms. In remembrance of Ma Mingxin, whose beard is said to have been shorn by government soldiers before his execution 1781, many Jahriyya members shave the sides of their beards.

In 1985, over 20,000 Chinese Muslims assembled at the site of Ma Mingxin's original (destroyed) tomb near Lanzhou for a commemoration ceremony. The tomb has since been rebuilt.

== See also ==
- List of Sufi orders
- History of the Soul, historical narrative about the rise of the Jahriyya by Zhang Chengzhi
- Khufiyya
