= Menhuan =

Chinese-style Sufi order

Menhuan (simplified Chinese: 门宦; traditional Chinese: 門宦; pinyin: Ménhuàn) is a term used by the Hui and Uyghur Muslim populations of China to indicate a Chinese Ṣūfī ṭarīḳa ("order" or "saintly lineage"). The leaders of a menhuan, which usually are Ṣūfī Muslim murs̲h̲id ("masters") or walī ("saints"), form a chain of spiritual successors over the ages, known in Arabic as silsilah, which goes back to the order's founder in China (e.g., Ma Laichi or Ma Mingxin), and beyond, toward his teachers in Arabia.

== Origin of the term ==
The term menhuan itself is of comparatively recent origin: according to Ma Tong (1983), it was first attested in an essay by the Hezhou Prefecture Magistrate Yang Zengxin dated 1897. It has been suggested by Chinese researchers that it has developed from menfa (门阀), meaning "powerful and influential family", or menhu (门户), which has been used in the Northwestern China to mean "gateway" or "faction".

== Characteristics ==
In most menhuan Ṣūfī orders, only a descendant of the founder is allowed to succeed as leader. Menhuan leaders typically have authority and control over property and appointments to positions within the order.

Among those that are part of a menhuan, specific rules and rituals play a large role in their religious devotion. As is found in other Muslim communities, menhuan followers have a high regard for the Quran and ḥadīth literature, along with commonly practicing the Five Pillars of Islam. However, other duties expected from menhuan followers include reverence for the founder of the Ṣūfī order, faithfully obeying their menhuan leader, and believing that past and present masters will help guide them to heaven.

Constructing gongbei where the performances of homage to their Ṣūfī order and leaders can take place are important in menhuan groups. Quranic recitations, dhikr chants, and meditations are commonplace among Chinese Ṣūfī Muslims.

== List of orders ==
- Jahriyya
- Khufiyya
- Kubrawiya
- Qadiriyya
