= Gongbei (Islamic architecture) =

Type of Islamic shrine among Hui and Uyghur people

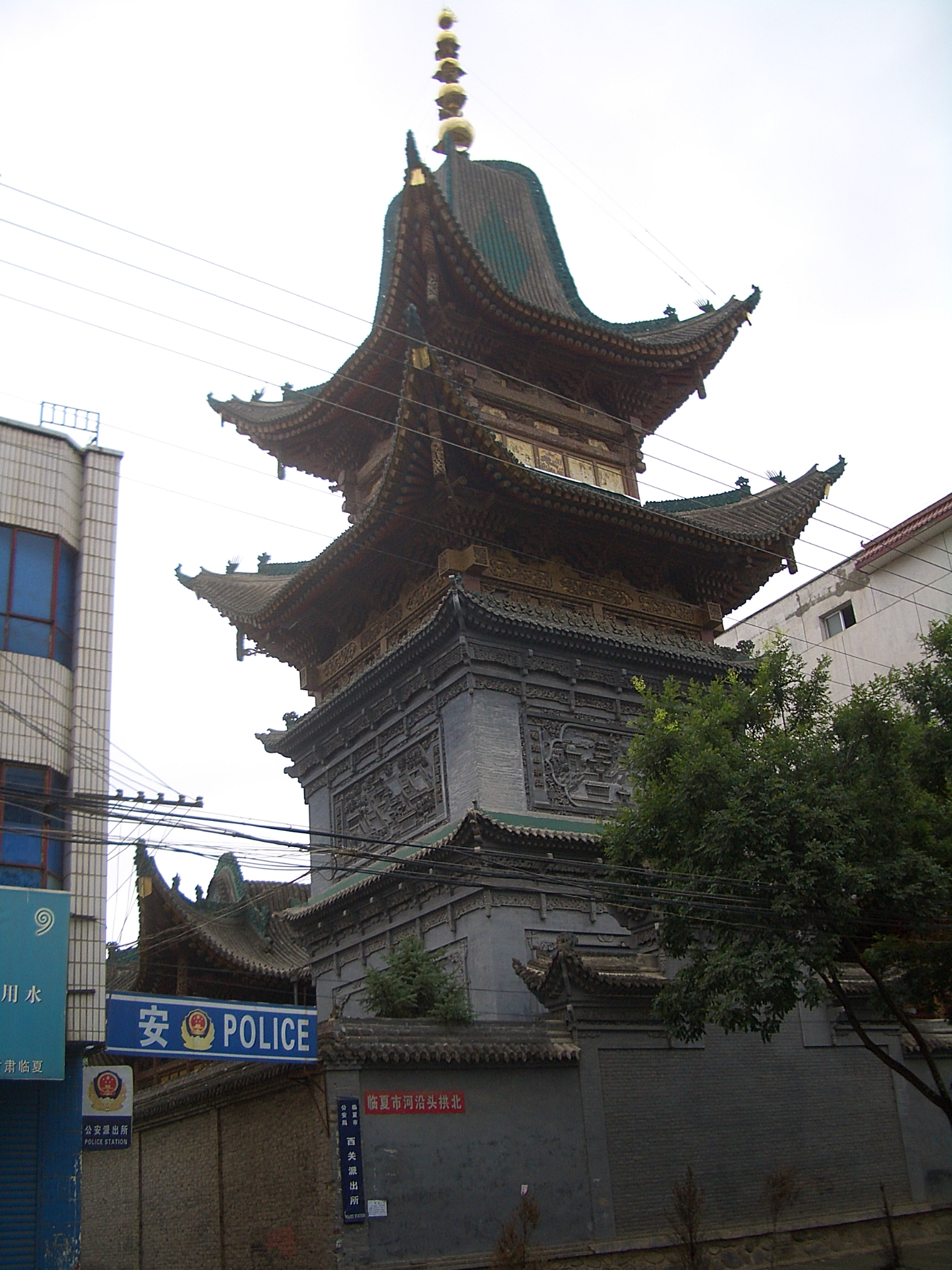
A gongbei in Linxia City

Gongbei (Chinese: 拱北; pinyin: Gǒngběi; from Persian: گنبد gonbad, meaning "dome", "cupola"), is a term used by the Hui and Uyghur Muslim populations of China in the Northwestern region to indicate an Islamic shrine complex centered on the grave (qabr) of a Ṣūfī Muslim murs̲h̲id ("master") or walī ("saint"), typically the founder of a menhuan (a Chinese Ṣūfī ṭarīḳa, or "saintly lineage"). The grave itself usually is topped with a dome. Similar Islamic facilities with the same purpose, known as dargāh or türbe, can be found in several other regions of the Muslim world.

Between 1958 and 1966, many Ṣūfī shrines and tombs in Ningxia and throughout Northwestern China in general were destroyed, viewed by the Chinese Communist government and authorities as relics of the old "feudal" order and symbols which the Chinese Communist Revolution (1946−1950) had attempted to eradicate through a series of atheistic and anti-religious campaigns, as well as for practical reasons ("wasting valuable farmland"). Once the right to freedom of religion became recognized once again in the 1980s, and much of the land reverted to the control of individual farmers, destroyed gongbei were often rebuilt once again.

== Characteristics ==
In Ningxia, the nearly 70 existing gongbei are divided into three groups.

1. As part of a daotang (instructional hall)
2. As part of an instructional hall on the same site as a prayer hall that may be with other structures
3. In combination with a mosque

When a site has as mosque, instructional hall, and a gongbei, the gongbei is set apart from the other two.

== See also ==
- Islam in China
  - Chinese Islamic architecture
