= Daxing =

Daxing (simplified Chinese: 大兴; traditional Chinese: 大興 unless otherwised noted) may refer to:

== Places in China ==
- Daxing or Daxingcheng (Daxing City), the capital of the Sui dynasty (581–618) before 605, known as Chang'an before and after the Sui
- Daxing District, a district of Beijing
- Beijing Daxing International Airport
- Tongren Fenghuang Airport, formerly known as Tongren Daxing Airport

=== Subdistricts ===
- Daxing Subdistrict, Songtao County, in Songtao Miao Autonomous County, Guizhou
- Daxing Subdistrict, Harbin, in Daowai District, Harbin, Heilongjiang
- Daxing Subdistrict, Kaifeng, in Longting District, Kaifeng, Henan
- Daxing Subdistrict, Shenyang, in Yuhong District, Shenyang, Liaoning

=== Towns ===
- Daxing, Anhui, in Hefei, Anhui
- Daxing, Chongqing, in Bishan District, Chongqing
- Daxing, Guangxi, in Du'an Yao Autonomous County, Guangxi
- Daxing, Tailai County, in Tailai County, Heilongjiang
- Daxing, Jiangsu, in Suqian, Jiangsu
- Daxing, Changling County, in Changling County, Jilin
- Daxing, Dongfeng County, in Dongfeng County, Jilin
- Daxing, Changtu County, in Changtu County, Liaoning
- Daxing, Dandong, in Fengcheng, Liaoning
- Daxing, Shandong, in Linshu County, Shandong
- Daxing, Chengdu, in Pujiang County, Sichuan
- Daxing, Ya'an, in Ya'an, Sichuan
- Daxing, Lüchun County, in Lüchun County, Yunnan
- Daxing, Ninglang County, in Ninglang Yi Autonomous County, Yunnan
- Daxing, Yongshan County, in Yongshan County, Yunnan

=== Townships ===
- Daxing Township, Heilongjiang, in Zhaoyuan County, Heilongjiang
- Daxing Township, Heishan County, in Heishan County, Liaoning
- Daxing Township, Huludao, in Huludao, Liaoning
- Daxing Township, Nanchong, in Nanchong, Sichuan
- Daxing Township, Qianwei County, in Qianwei County, Sichuan
- Daxing Township, Songpan County (大姓乡), in Songpan County, Sichuan
- Daxing Township, Tongjiang County, in Tongjiang County, Sichuan
- Daxing Township, Xichang, in Xichang, Sichuan
- Daxing Hui Ethnic Township, in Yanting County, Sichuan
- Daxing Township, Yunnan, in Gengma Dai and Va Autonomous County, Yunnan

== Historical eras ==
- Daxing (318–322), possibly Taixing (太興), era name used by Emperor Yuan of Jin
- Daxing (737–774, 781?–794) or Daeheung, era name used by Mun of Balhae

== See also ==
- 大興 (disambiguation)
- Daxin (disambiguation)
- Tai Hing Estate, a public housing estate in Tuen Mun, New Territories, Hong Kong
