= Daxin =

Daxin (Chinese: 大新 unless otherwise noted) may refer to these places in China:

- Daxin County, in Chongzuo, Guangxi
- Daxin Subdistrict (大信街道), Qingdao, Shandong

== Towns ==
- Daxin, Fuyang, in Taihe County, Anhui
- Daxin, Wuhe County, in Wuhe County, Anhui
- Daxin, Guigang, in Pingnan County, Guangxi
- Daxin, Henan, in Fugou County, Henan
- Daxin, Hubei, in Dawu County, Hubei
- Daxin, Hunan, in Xinshao County, Hunan
- Daxin, Jiangsu, in Zhangjiagang, Jiangsu
- Daxin, Ningxia, in Yinchuan, Ningxia

== Other ==
- Daxin (malware)

== See also ==
- Dacin Tigers (達欣), a Taiwanese basketball team
- Daxing (disambiguation)
