= Baba Mosque =

Sufi mosque in Langzhong, Sichuan

- 清真巴巴寺
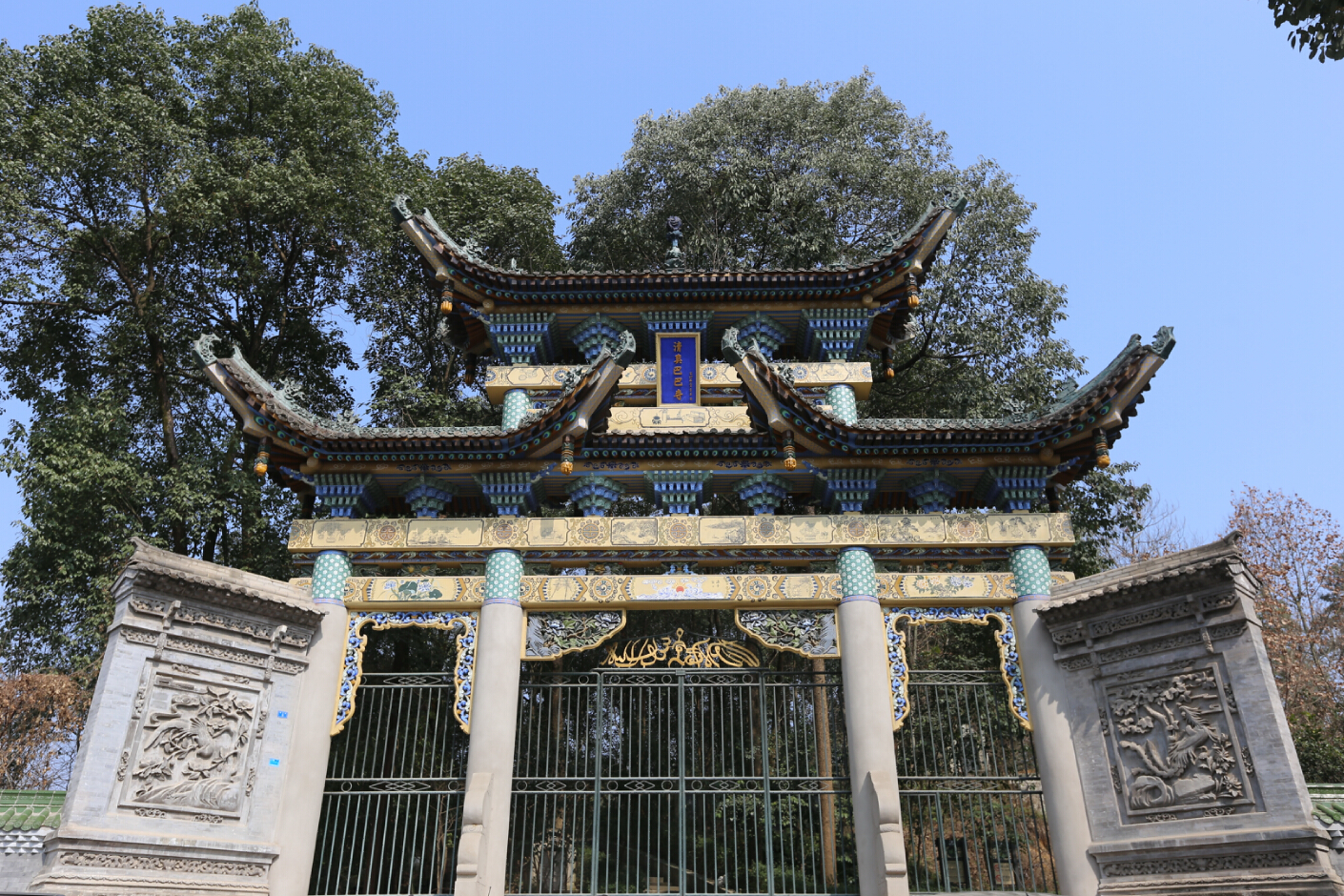

Religion
- Affiliation: Sunni Islam
- Sect: Sufism; Qadri
- Ecclesiastical or organizational status: Mosque
- Status: Active

Location
- Location: HXQH+R2X Baba Temple, Panlong Rd, Langzhong, Nanchong, Sichuan
- Country: China
- Interactive map of Baba Mosque

Architecture
- Type: Mosque
- Style: Sichuan
- Founder: Qi Jingyi, Ma Ziyun
- Completed: Late 17th century CE

Major cultural heritage sites under national-level protection
- Official name: 全国重点文物保护单位
- Type: National
- Designated: 5 March 2013
- Reference no.: 7-1339-3-637

The Baba Mosque (Note: Also known by multiple names such as the Jiuzhao Pavilion, the Baoning Mosque, and the Panlong Mountain Qubbah.) (Chinese: 清真巴巴寺) is a mosque and shrine of the Chinese Sufi (門宦) of Qadiriyya sect that is located in Panlong Mountain, Langzhong City, in the Sichuan province of China.

Construction of the mosque dates from the Qing Dynasty period. On September 16, 1996, it was declared as the Sichuan Provincial-level Protected Cultural Heritage Site in Sichuan Province, and in 2013 it was listed as a Chinese major cultural heritage site.

== See also ==
- Langzhong Mosque
- Islam in Sichuan
- List of mosques in China
- List of Major National Historical and Cultural Sites in Sichuan
- Sufism in China
