= Guabang Mosque =

Mosque in Baima, Miyi, Sichuan, China

掛榜清真寺
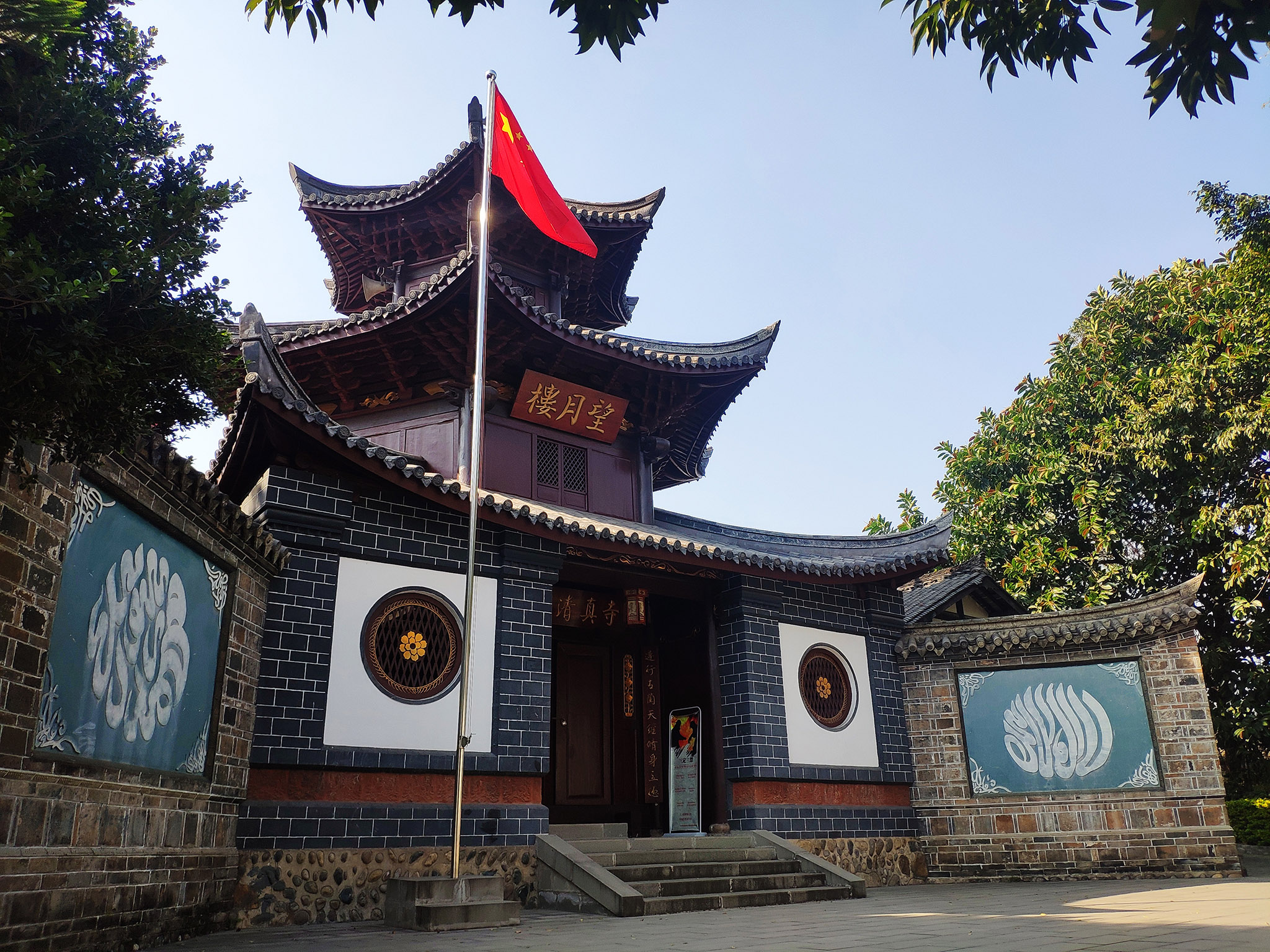

Religion
- Affiliation: Islam
- Branch/tradition: Sunni Islam
- Ecclesiastical or organizational status: active

Location
- Country: China

Architecture
- Established: 18th century

The Guabang Mosque (Note: Guabang Mosque is also known as the Wangyuelou Mosque, Tianba Mosque, and Miyi Mosque.) (Chinese: 挂榜清真寺; pinyin: guà bǎng qīng zhēn sì) is located in Tianba Village, Baima Town, Miyi County, Sichuan Province, China.

== History ==
The mosque was constructed in 1703 during the Qing dynasty (42nd year of Emperor Kangxi's reign). According to historical records preserved on two stone tablets within the mosque complex, subsequent renovations and expansions were carried out during the Qianlong, Jiaqing, and Daoguang reigns.

The mosque survived natural weathering and earthquakes that struck the Xichang area during the Daoguang period. In 1990, restoration work was undertaken through the joint efforts of the Sichuan Provincial Cultural Relics and Archaeology Research Institute, Panzhihua Cultural Relics Management Office, and Miyi County Cultural Center, focusing on reinforcing the Wangyue Tower (Moon-Viewing Pavilion).

In 1991, the mosque was designated as a Sichuan Provincial-level Protected Cultural Heritage Site, the only ancient architectural site with this status in Panzhihua. In 2021, Panzhihua Vice Mayor Li Ming conducted research and supervision of the mosque's cultural relic safety.

== See also ==
- Islam in Sichuan
