= Baimao =

Baimao could refer to the following locations in China:

- Baimao, Wuwei County (白茆镇), town in Wuwei County, Anhui
- Baimao, Yuexi County, Anhui (白帽镇), town
- Baimao, Linshu County (白旄镇), town in Linshu County, Shandong
