= Zhaoyuan =

Zhaoyuan may refer to two county-level divisions of the People's Republic of China:

- Zhaoyuan, Shandong (招远市), county-level city of Yantai, Shandong
- Zhaoyuan County (肇源县), of Daqing, Heilongjiang
