= Islam in Sichuan =

Sichuanese religious minority

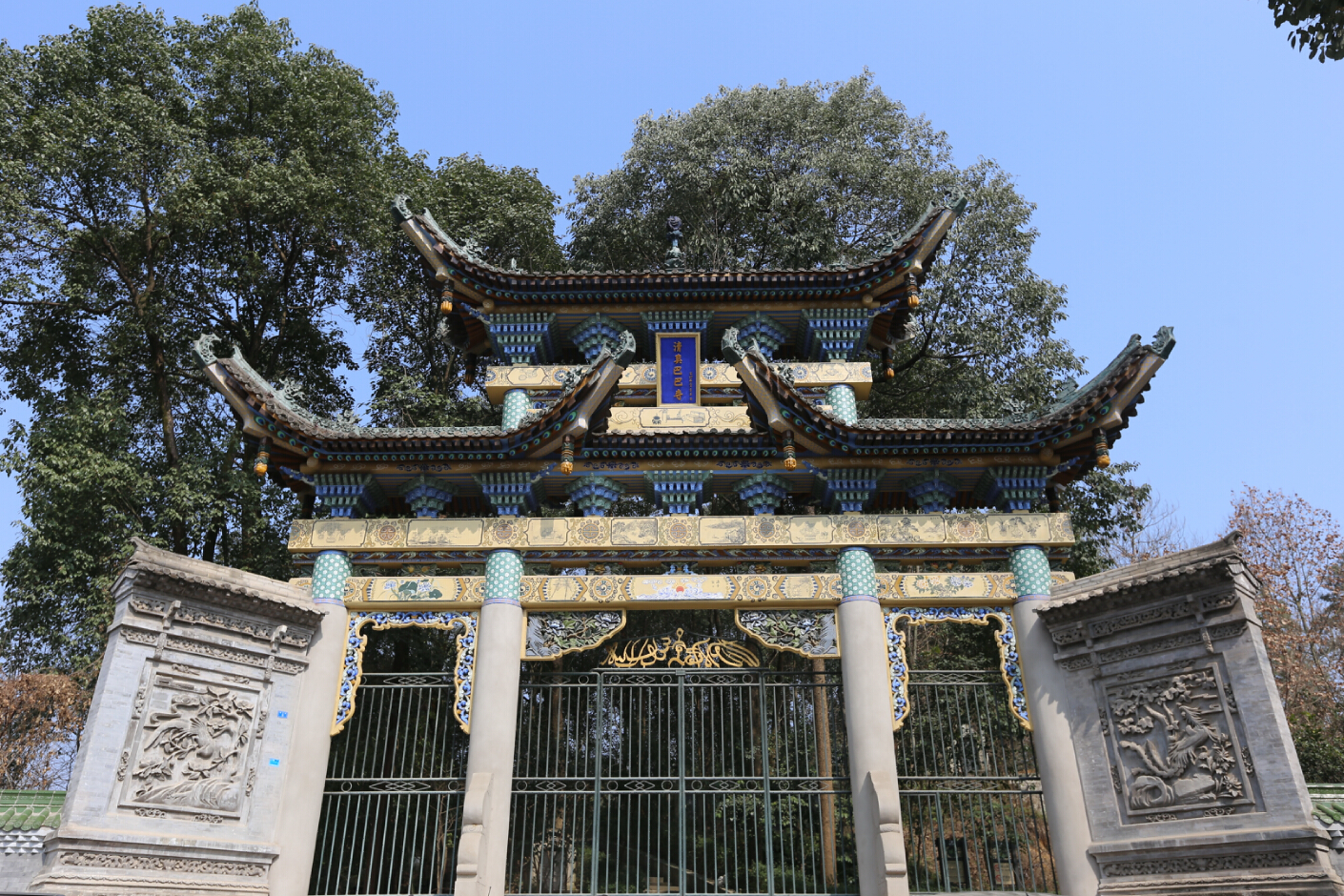
Baba Mosque, a 17th-century Qadiri Sufi mosque in Langzhong founded by Ma Ziyun and Hilal al-Din, contains the tomb of the Khwaja Sayyed ʻAbd Allāh, a 29th generation descendant of Muhammad.

Islam is a minority religion in the Chinese province of Sichuan. The total number of Muslims are 112,478 according to a 2004 census conducted by the Islamic Association of China, the majority are ethnic Hui. Chengdu, the provincial capital, and Xichang, capital of the Liangshan Yi Autonomous Prefecture, are the two cities with high concentration and long history of the Hui communities. According to a 1990 census, 23,288 Muslims resided in Ngawa Tibetan and Qiang Autonomous Prefecture of western Sichuan, with about 40 mosques catering to their religious needs. Counties with highest number of Muslims in this region are Ma'o, Ngawa, Quqên, Sirza Degu, Sungqu, Tsanlha, and Zoigê.

== Background ==
=== Persians in Sichuan ===
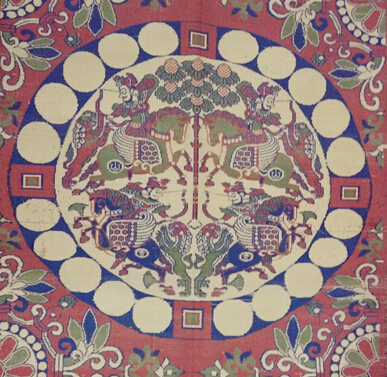
Sichuan brocade textile featuring a Sasanian horsemen hunting scene within "Sogdian pearl roundel", 7th–10th century.

Persian settlers and immigrants were found in Sichuan during the period of Tang dynasty (618–907), Former (907–925) and Later Shu (934–965). Among those in the recorded history whose names are known today including An Fuguo (安附國), a governor of Weizhou (in modern-day Li County) during the mid-7th century; Shi Chuwen (石處溫), who held the official post of Sima of Lizhou during the Former Shu period; Mu Zhaosi (穆昭嗣), a renowned physician; and the most well-known Li Shunxian, a poet and concubine of the Emperor Wang Zongyan of Former Shu, and her two brothers Li Xun, a poet and pharmacologist, author of Overseas Pharmacopoeia (海藥本草), and Li Xuan, also a pharmacologist and alchemist, although their religion is a subject of debate.

=== Geographical position ===
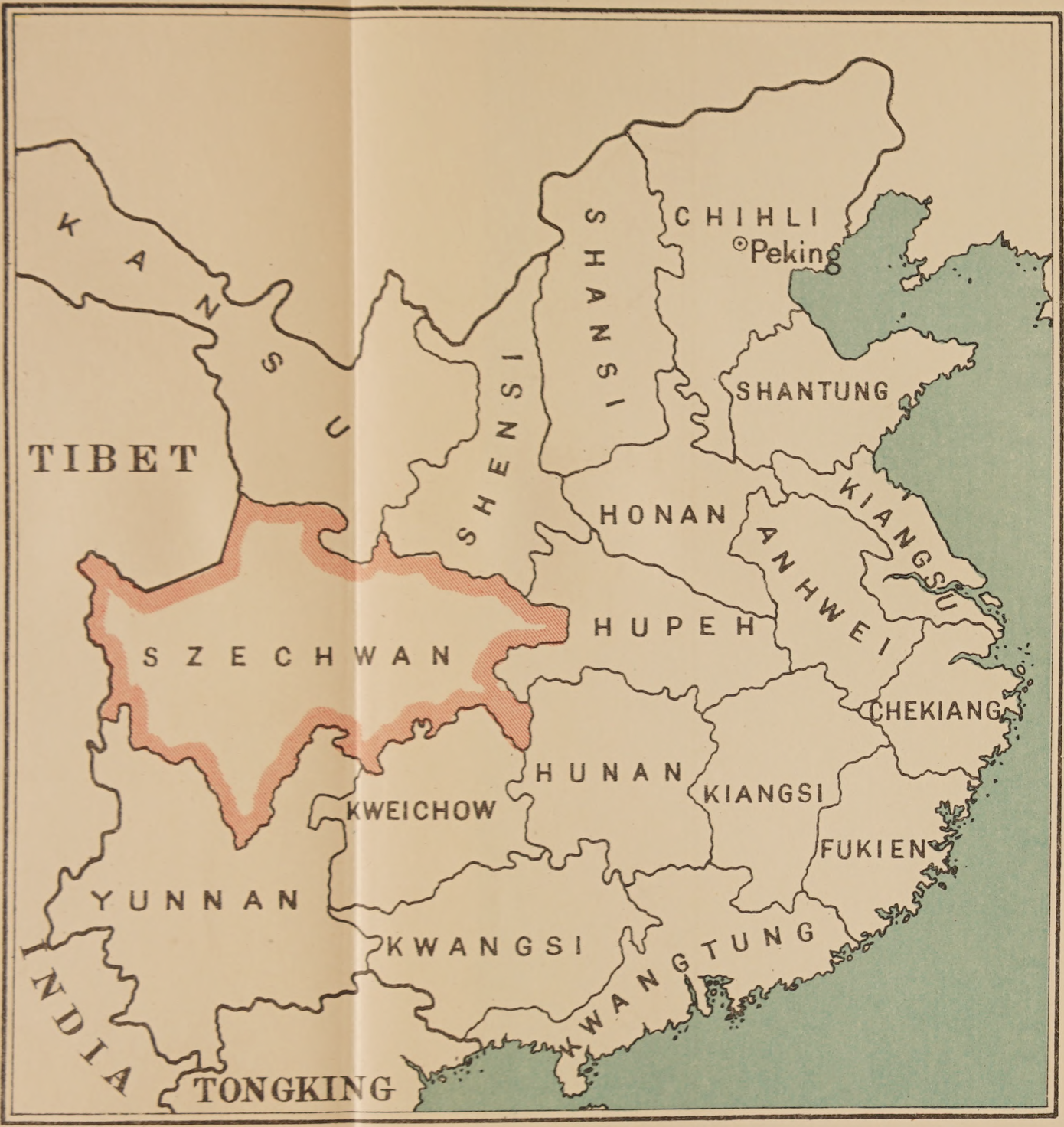
An old location map of Sichuan (formerly spelled Szechwan).

In his article "The Cross-Boundary Networks of the Hui Muslim Communities", Professor Tsai Yuan-lin of National Chengchi University of Taipei gave a brief description of the geographical position of Sichuan, writing: "Historically speaking, Sichuan had been the frontier province from the Han viewpoint, surrounded by the Muslims of the North-western provinces, the Tibetans of Qinghai and Tibet, and the Yi, Miao and other ethnic minorities of Yunnan and Guizhou (Kweichow); from the Hui viewpoint, Sichuan had been the crossroad of the North-western, Southwestern, and Eastern provinces. The long history of the co-existence and social contact among the Han and Hui immigrants, and the indigenous peoples creates the largely diverse cultural and religious landscape of Sichuan."

== History ==
Although being a minority religion in Sichuan, Islam is not a recent arrival, its presence can be traced back to the 10th century, albeit on a small scale. In the early 13th century, the Mongol Empire conscripted Muslim soldiers from various ethnic groups in Central Asia and incorporated them into the tammači troops during the reign of Ögedei Khan. Islam spread massively into the province during and after the Mongol conquest of Sichuan.

The Ming dynasty (1368–1644) saw a significant number of Muslim settlers from Gansu, Hubei, Hunan, Shaanxi and the Jiangnan region. This is recorded in a large number of county histories, the genealogy books of the Muslims, and inscriptions on memorial steles to constructions of mosques. In the Annals of Guangyuan County compiled in the Republican Era (1912–1949), it is recorded that "Islam flourished in Guangyuan during the Yuan and Ming dynasties". The inscription on the memorial stele of Long'an Mosque, Pingwu records that the mosque was built in the early Ming dynasty. The genealogy book of the Mas of Shaguoying, Xichang states that in 1392, their ancestor Ma Gang (馬綱), a military commander, led his troops to Sichuan to fight the rebellion of Yerutömör. According to the Annals of Xichang County, the oldest mosque in Xichang was built in 1369. During the Ming dynasty, significant numbers of Muslims were to be found in Chengdu, Guanxian and Xindu, with their mosques located in the three districts. A mosque was also erected by Ma Wensheng in Chongqing in the middle of the Ming dynasty, to cater to the spiritual needs of 100-odd Muslim families settled in the south of Yuzhong District.

The Baba Mosque founded at Langzhong in the late 17th century by Ma Ziyun (馬子雲) and Hilal al-Din contains the tomb of the Khwaja Sayyed ʻAbd Allāh, a 29th generation descendant of Muhammad and teacher (murshid) of the two founders, who entered Langzhong in 1684 and died in 1689. The mosque later became a Qadiri pilgrimage site for Sichuanese Muslims, and a central shrine of the Qadiriyya in China. The city of Langzhong, formerly known as Baoning (保寧), was referred to as "Eastern Mecca" by some Chinese Muslims.

The Muslim population reached its peak in the Qing dynasty (1644–1912). After the Suppression of the Chuchen Hill Peoples in the 18th century, most of the Muslim soldiers settled in this region. This period also saw a mass migration of Muslims from Baoqing Prefecture (modern-day Shaoyang, Hunan), most of whom settled in southern and western Sichuan. Jahriyya was introduced into Mianning and Xichang via Yunnan at some point between 1820 and 1850, both in the south. It had nevertheless a bigger impact on the Muslim communities in the northern city of Guangyuan. In 1873, the defeat of the Panthay Rebellion in Yunnan prompted numerous Muslims to move to Sichuan to escape persecution. In addition, the spread of Islam in Sichuan owed a debt to those Muslim merchants from Gansu and Shaanxi, at least three mosques in Chengdu were built by them, namely the Yixue Mosque of Gansu Muslims, the Jiu Mosque and Qinfu Mosque.

== Denominations ==
Muslims in Sichuan belong to the Sunni branch, the majority follows the Qadim school. Most of the Ikhwan followers are concentrated in the cities of Guangyuan and Jiangyou. With regard to the Sufis, Jahriyya and Qadiriyya are popular in northern Sichuan, with the former being the most influential school. Apart from the five provinces of Northwestern China (Gansu, Ningxia, Qinghai, Shaanxi, and Xinjiang), Sichuan is the only province with significant numbers of Sufi followers.

== Education ==
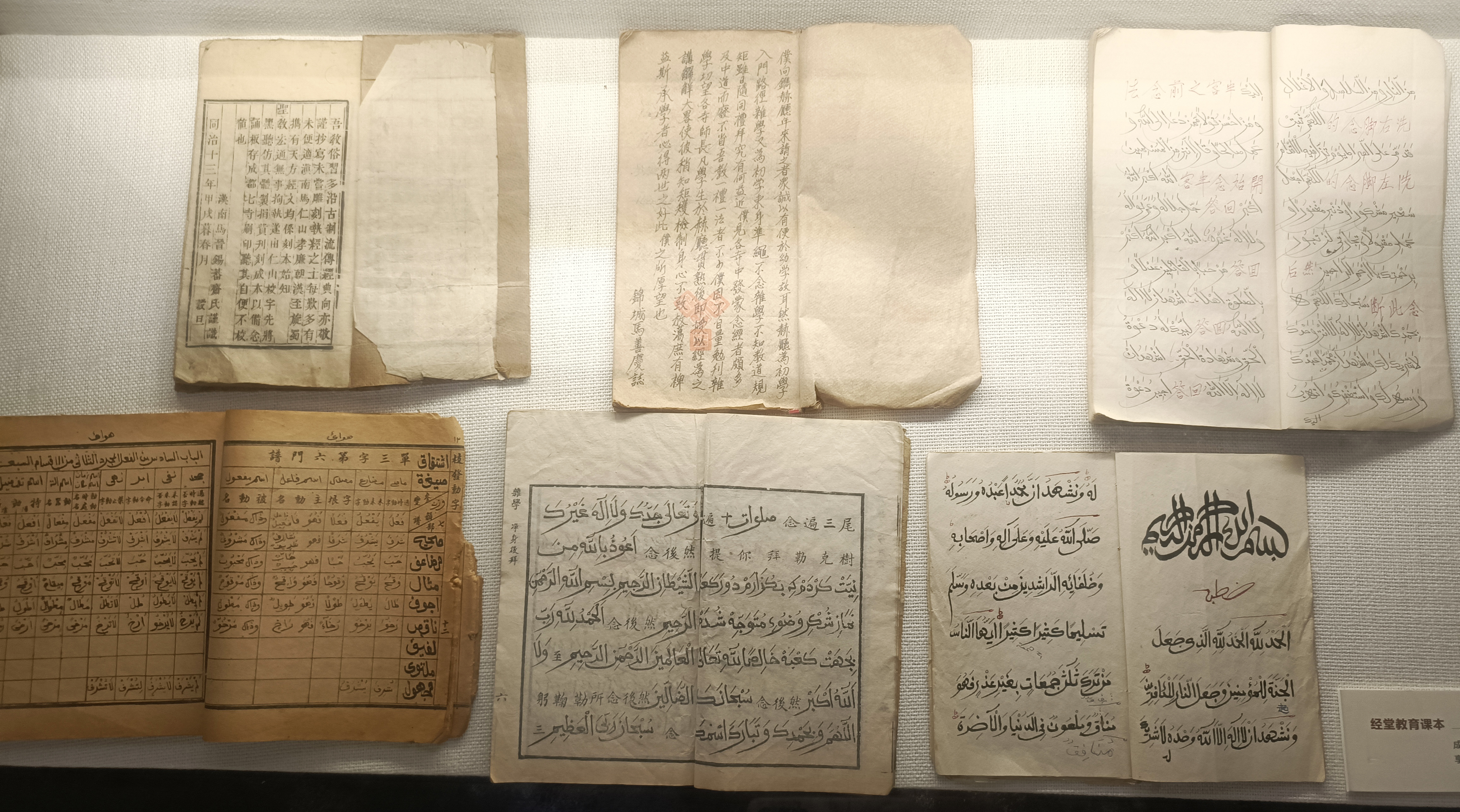
Jingtang Jiaoyu textbooks in Chengdu Huangcheng Mosque

Jingtang Jiaoyu (lit. 'scripture hall education') appeared in Sichuan in the early Qing period. A such school was opened immediately at Chengdu Huangcheng Mosque after its completion. As reported by Su Dexuan (蘇德宣) in his 1934 article "A Brief Introduction to Sichuanese Muslims": "Chengdu is the cradle of Islamic education, most of Sichuan's respected akhunds have been taught in this city." Chengdu Muslim Primary School is the first modern Islamic school in China opened in 1902, followed by Chongqing Xisigong Primary School (1907) and Guangyuan Islamic Primary School. The most influential one, however, is the Islamic Normal School of Wanxian, established in 1928.

== A missionary's observation ==
James Hutson (1869–1929), a British missionary of the China Inland Mission, lived in Dujiangyan (formerly known as Kwan Hsien [Guanxian]) during the early 20th century. He authored a short observation of the city's Muslim residents which was published in his 1915 book Mythical and Practical in Szechwan:

The Chinese have always regarded the incoming of a new religion as a precursor of trouble, and in the case of Muhammadanism this has been no exception, as a large proportion of Chinese rebellions and provincial strifes have been either directly or indirectly connected with Muhammadans.

Those living in this district of Kwan Hsien say that they migrated from Turkistan, and many of them still speak of Turkey as their country, and Sultan as their Spiritual Head and religious potentate. The physiognomy of this people is distinctly foreign and quite different from that of the Chinese, many of them being tall in stature with oval faces, aquiline noses and dark skins. [...]

They arrived in this city during the reign of the Emperor Kien-long and an old gentleman with whom I talked recently can trace his descent on Chinese soil for forty generations. Undoubtedly there have been some proselytes from amongst the Chinese, but in this place, within the memory of the oldest Moslem only one family has embraced the religion, and that was manœuvred by the ties of marriage, a Muhammadan of wealth betrothing his daughter to a heathen on condition that he embraced the faith. I have only known one person to leave Islam, she being a woman of doubtful character who married a Chinese.

[...]

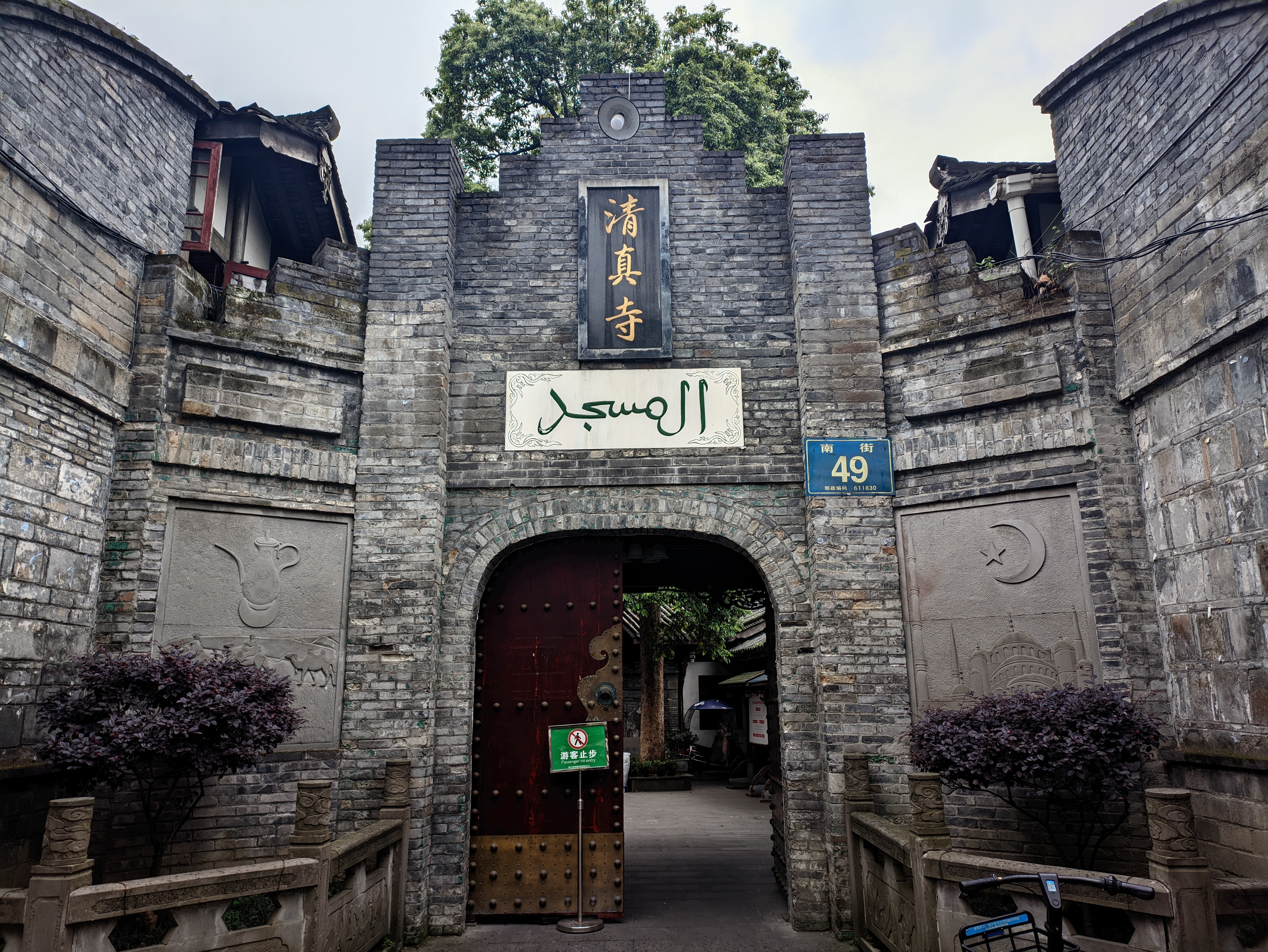
South Street Mosque

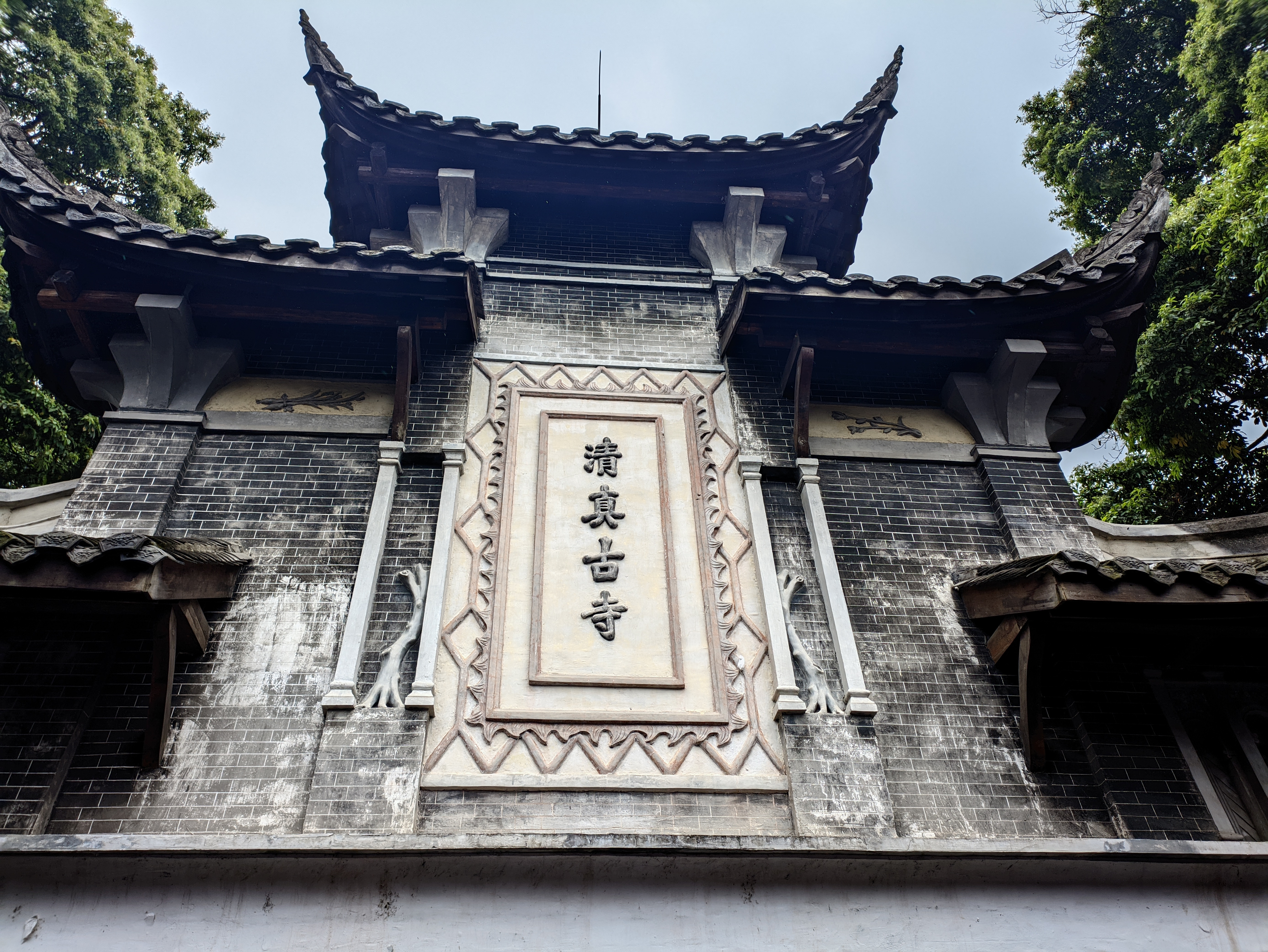
Baoping Lane Mosque

Two mosques in Dujiangyan

In Kwan Hsien we have two mosques, and about 140 families of resident Muhammadans, but we have a large number of visiting Moslems from the North and West, thus making this more of a Muhammadan centre than it otherwise would be. [...]

The Muhammadan religion here as elsewhere consists in so many external forms of worship; prayers, washings, fastings, hatred of idolatry, pig's flesh etc. They believe in one True God and Muhammad as His prophet; also, in angels, patriarchs, demons and spirits. Prayer is observed five times daily, though only very few attend except on Chu Mü Sabbath.

[...]

The mosques are of Chinese structure and have no minarets, they are built by the gifts of the faithful; in the outer courtyards are Mullah's private apartments, students' dormitories and class rooms, with guest halls and ceremonial washing room. On a table at the entrance to the main building is placed a tablet to the Emperor of China. Some Muhammadans say it is put there to keep out rowdy Chinese; others take care to point out that if it was for worship it would be placed at the top of the Mosque.

The Mosque is a large and impressive hall, almost four square, perhaps slightly deeper than it is wide; at the top, in the centre, is "the prayer niche." This is a false door on which a flower vase and flowers are engraved in gilt; to the right is a short flight of steps and a small platform from which the Koran is read on the Moslem Sabbath; in the centre is an incense urn in which incense is kept burning during prayers. The Mullah was careful to explain that the only object in burning it was to overpower obnoxious smells. On the left is a small, oblong table on which the Koran is placed when not in use. [...]

On entering, all shoes are taken off; all turn towards the prayer niche, or towards the West, which is the direction of Mecca, the Mosque frontage being towards the East. The whole worship is conducted in Arabic, and as the Koran has been forbidden to be translated into Chinese, a great number cannot read Arabic, even many of the Mullahs study it under great difficulty, therefore the worship is to many a mere matter of form. The fact that they are monotheists does not seem to have improved their morals: they practise polygamy, and their women are almost wholly uneducated and superstitious. They conform to the heathenish custom of foot-binding but though not allowed into mosques, they are supposed to worship in their own homes.

[...]

They are expert dealers in live stock, such as sheep, cattle, goats, and horses and control the beef and mutton trade, also the milk market. [...]

No Muhammadan may become an actor or pretend to be a demon by painting his face, or by cutting his flesh. No one may discuss the pros and cons of other religions. No Moslem becomes a barber. Mullahs shave in mosques with prepared water, others shave outside, but a good Moslem will not wash in the same water, sleep in the same bed, drink out of the same vessel, or eat from the same basin, as a heathen. Pig's flesh is hated and banished from the homes and streets where the Muhammadans live, and this seems to be the biggest bone of contention with the Chinese, who love the flesh of the hog. There is a kind of fellow feeling with the Christians on account of their being monotheists, but, whilst agreeing with our simple forms of worship, the Mullah told me they differed about the crucifixion of Christ. [...] In connexion with each mosque there is a school for teaching Arabic, and the Mullah told me he also teaches Persian; no fees are paid by the pupils, and the classes are divided into three grades. [...] The patrons of each mosque invite and pay their own Mullahs; a sum is set apart from the general fund for his work of teaching, and besides he gets fees for reading the Koran at births, marriages and deaths. [...] A heathen may be admitted into the religion by washing and having a patriarchal name given to him, but seeing he has not been circumcized he can hold no place of leadership in the mosque.

[...]

== Gallery ==
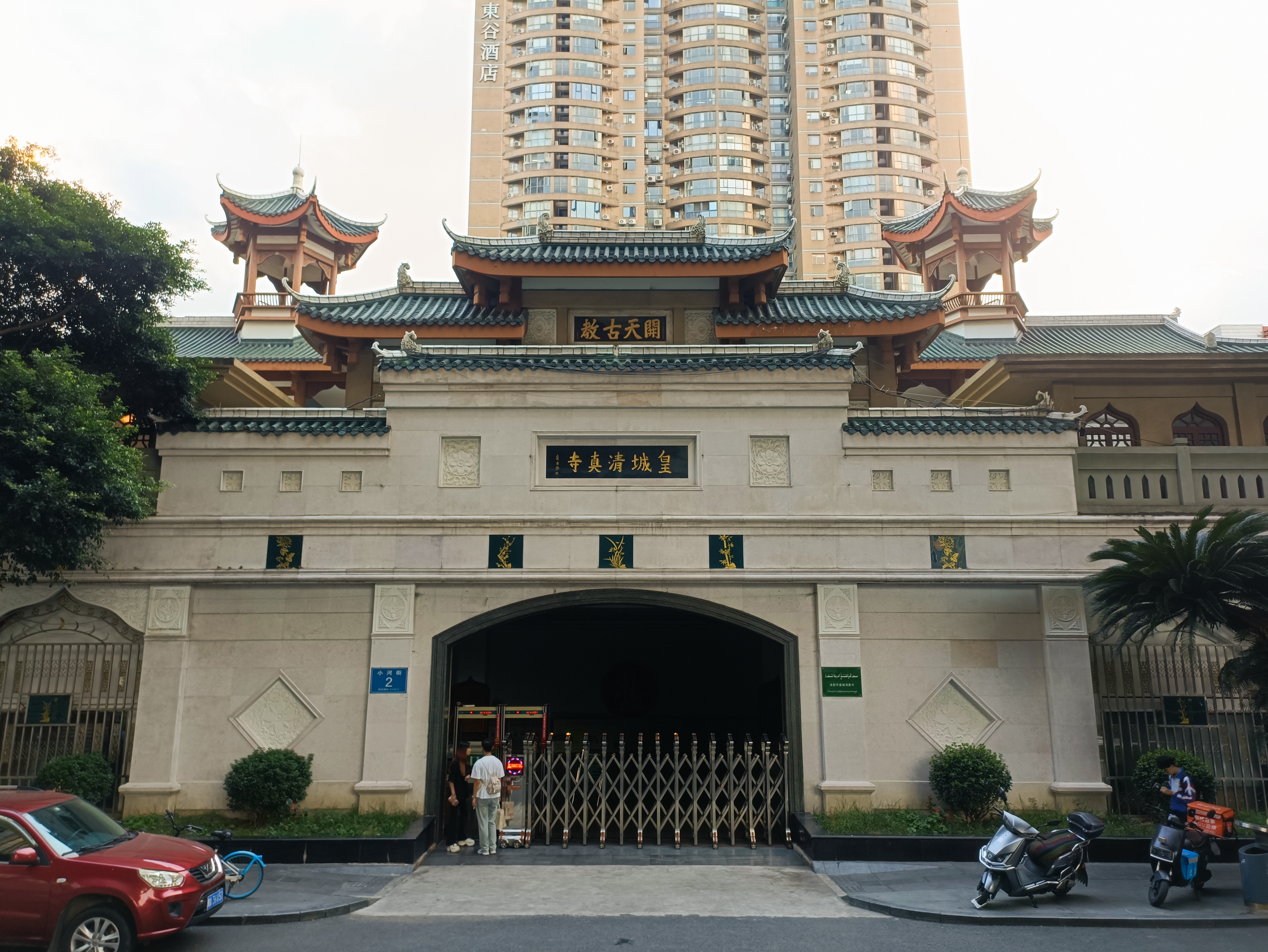
Chengdu Huangcheng Mosque, Chengdu

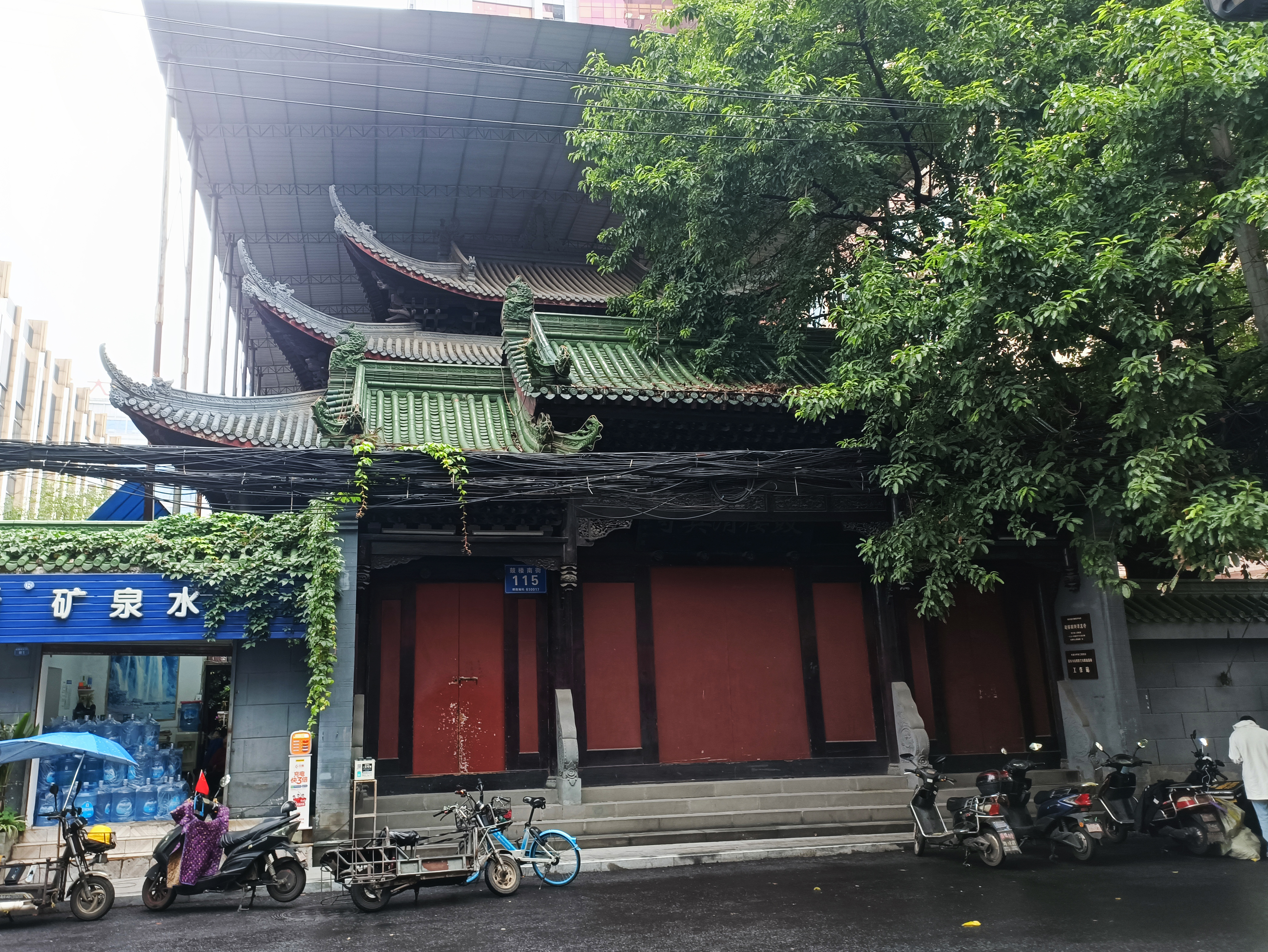
Gulou South Street Mosque, Chengdu

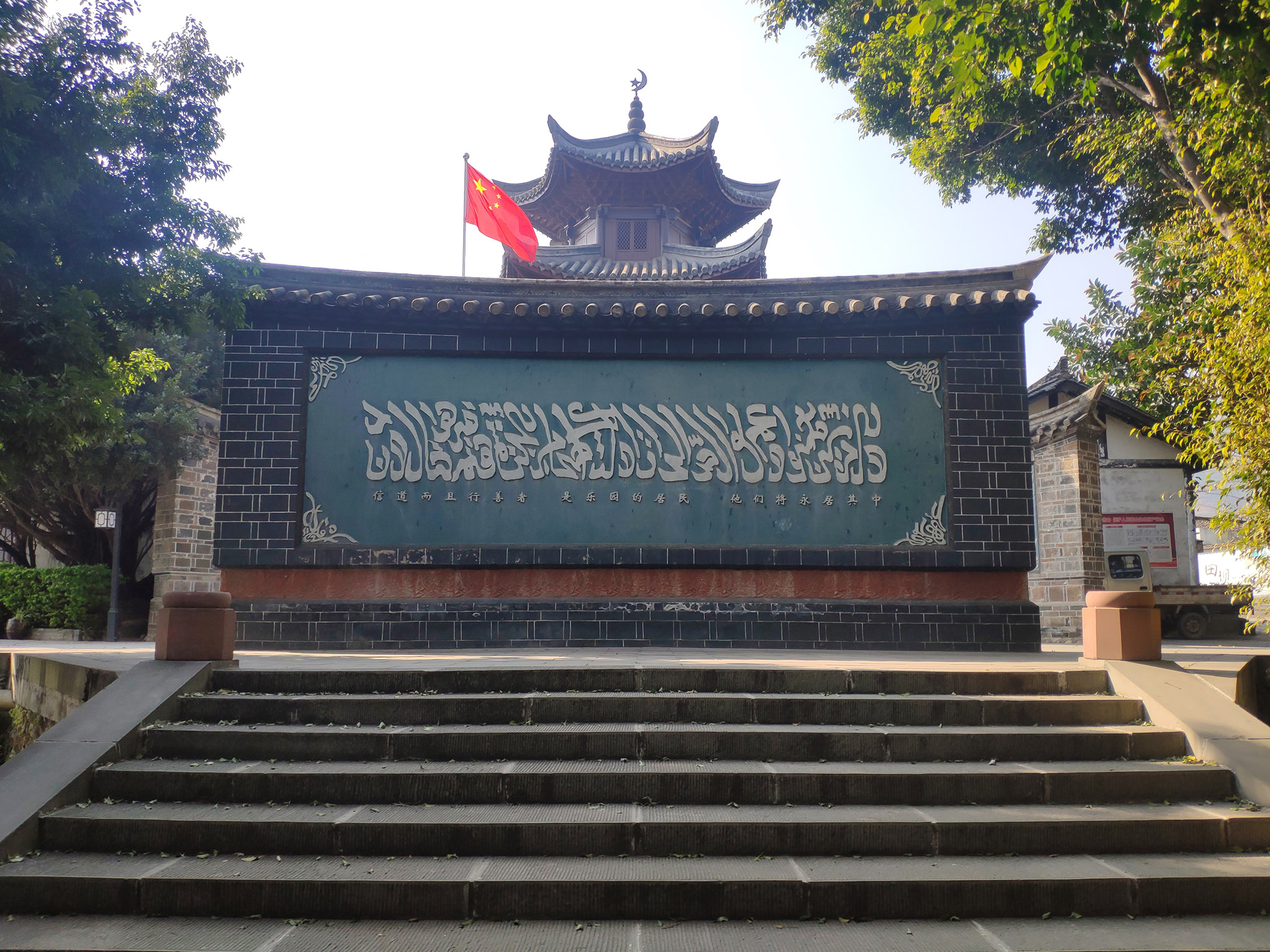
Miyi Mosque, Baima, Miyi County

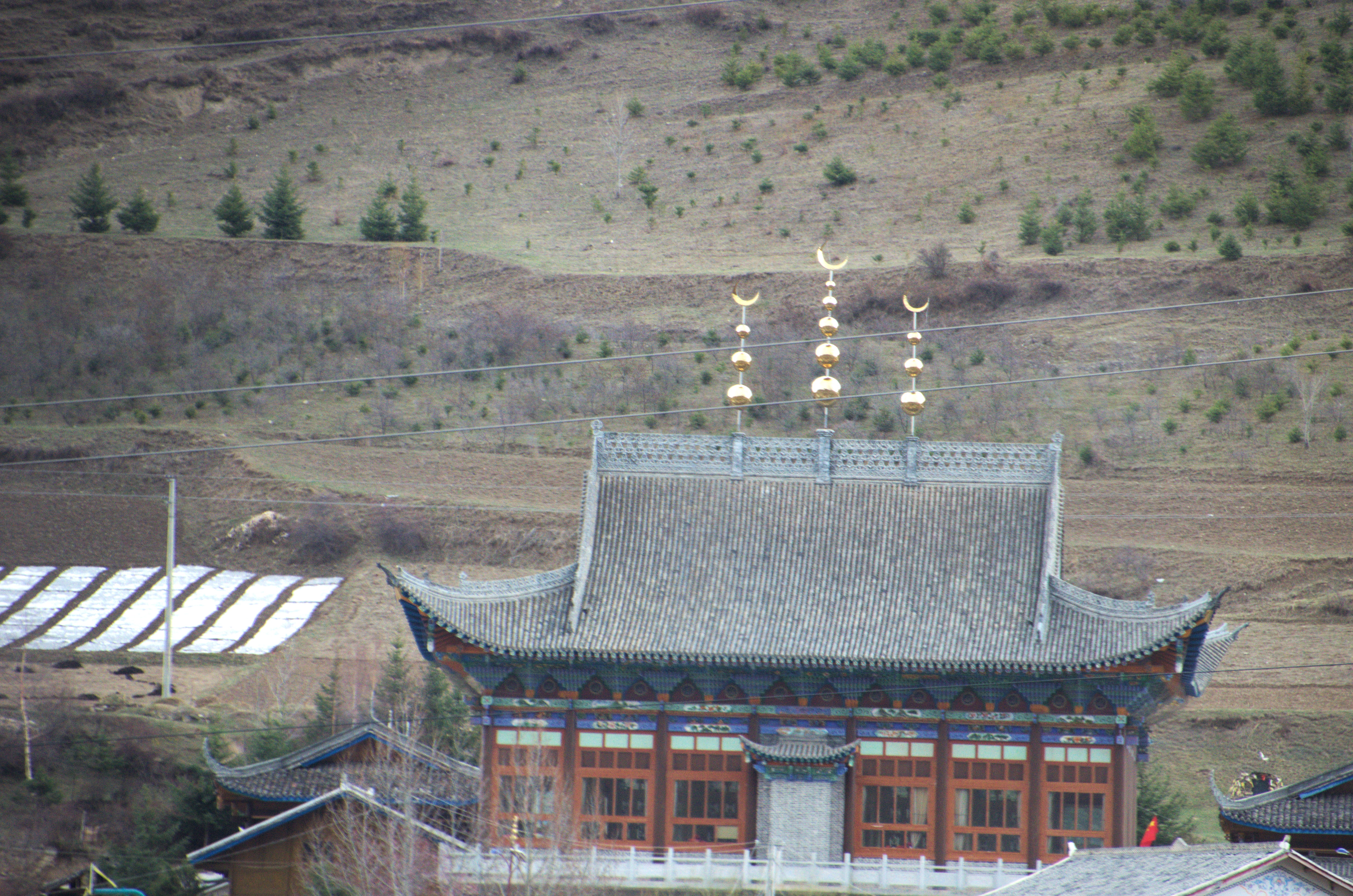
Yousuotun Mosque, Sungqu

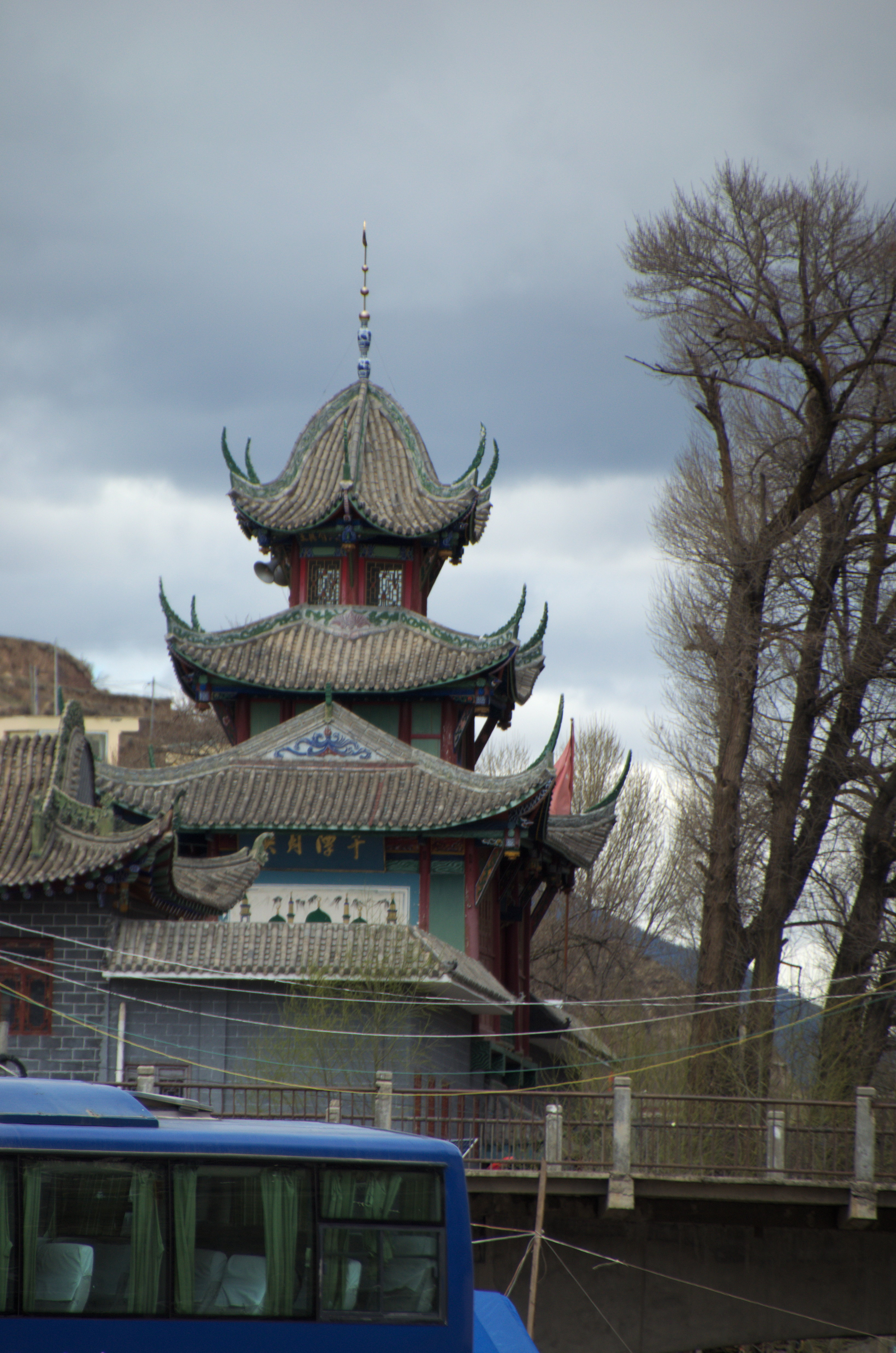
North Mosque, Sungqu

== See also ==
- Christianity in Sichuan
- Zoroastrianism in Sichuan
- Islam in Tibet
- Islamification of Xinjiang
- Daxing Hui Ethnic Township
- Phoenix Mountain Mosque
