= Langzhong Mosque =

Mosque in Langzhong, Sichuan, China

- 閬中清真寺

Religion
- Affiliation: Sunni Islam
- Ecclesiastical or organizational status: Mosque
- Status: Active

Location
- Location: Langzhong, Nanchong, Sichuan
- Country: China
- Interactive map of Langzhong Mosque

Architecture
- Completed: 1689 CE

The Langzhong Mosque is a mosque located on Baili Temple Street, Langzhong City, in the Sichuan province of China.

It has been dated to the era of Tang, Ming, and Qing dynasties. On December 27, 2002, it was designated as part of the sixth batch of provincial-level protected cultural heritage sites in Sichuan. At that time it was merged with the Qingzhu Baba Mosque and the Chuanbei Dao Gongyuan, and collectively renamed the Langzhong Ancient Architectural Complex.

== See also ==
- Islam in Sichuan
- List of mosques in China
