= Phoenix Mountain Mosque =

Mosque in Chengdu, Sichuan, China

- 凤凰山清真寺
- Location of the mosque in Sichuan

Religion
- Affiliation: Sunni Islam
- Ecclesiastical or organizational status: Mosque
- Status: active

Location
- Location: Jinniu, Chengdu, Sichuan
- Country: China
- Interactive map of Phoenix Mountain Mosque
- Coordinates: 30°43′40″N 104°5′00″E

Architecture
- Type: mosque

The Phoenix Mountain Mosque (simplified Chinese: 凤凰山清真寺; traditional Chinese: 鳳凰山清真寺; pinyin: Fènghuáng Shān Qīngzhēnsì) is a mosque in Jinniu District, Chengdu, in the Sichuan province of China.

== Etymology ==
The mosque draws it name from where it is located, between mountains which are shaped like a phoenix.

== History ==
The mosque was originally the cemetery for Hui people which was opened in 1952. Later a mosque was built in the area to offer better services to the Muslim community around the area.

== See also ==
- Islam in Sichuan
- List of mosques in China
