= Daeheung =

- Hangul: 대흥
- Hanja: 大興
- RR: Daeheung
- MR: Taehŭng

Daeheung may refer to:

- Daeheung, the era name of Mun of Balhae
- Daeheung, a county of South Pyongan Province, North Korea
- Daeheung-myeon, a township of Yesan County, South Chungcheong Province, South Korea
  - Daeheung, a former county of South Chungcheong Province
- Daeheung-dong, 6 neighbourhoods in South Korea

== See also ==
- 大興 (disambiguation)
