= Daxin, Wuhe County =

Daxin 大新镇
- Town
- Location in China
- Coordinates: 33°0′30″N 117°41′51″E
- Country: People's Republic of China
- Province: Anhui
- Prefecture-level city: Bengbu
- County: Wuhe County
- Time zone: UTC+8 (China Standard)

Daxin (Chinese: 大新; pinyin: Dàxīn) is a town under the administration of Wuhe County, Anhui, China. As of 2020, it has nine villages under its administration:

- Daxin Village
- Zhangwei Village (张圩村)
- Xinbei Village (新北村)
- Maotan Village (毛滩村)
- Liuduo Village (刘朵村)
- Futai Village (府台村)
- Guofu Village (郭府村)
- Hantai Village (韩台村)
- Goubei Village (沟北村)
