= 大興 =

大興 or 大兴 may refer to:

- Daxing (disambiguation) (simplified Chinese: 大兴; traditional Chinese: 大興)
- Daeheung (disambiguation) (Korean: 大興)
- Tai Hing Estate (Chinese: 大興邨), a public housing estate in Tuen Mun, New Territories, Hong Kong
