= Longting, Kaifeng =

Coordinates: 34°49′03″N 114°21′33″E

Longting 龙亭区
- District
- Interactive map of Longting
- Country: People's Republic of China
- Province: Henan
- Prefecture-level city: Kaifeng

Area
  - Total: 345 km^{2} (133 sq mi)

Population (2019)
  - Total: 436,000
  - Density: 1,260/km^{2} (3,270/sq mi)
- Time zone: UTC+8 (China Standard)
- Postal code: 475000

Longting District (simplified Chinese: 龙亭区; traditional Chinese: 龍亭區; pinyin: Lóngtíng Qū) is a district and the municipal seat of the city of Kaifeng, Henan province, China. In 2005, Jinming District was merged with Longting District.

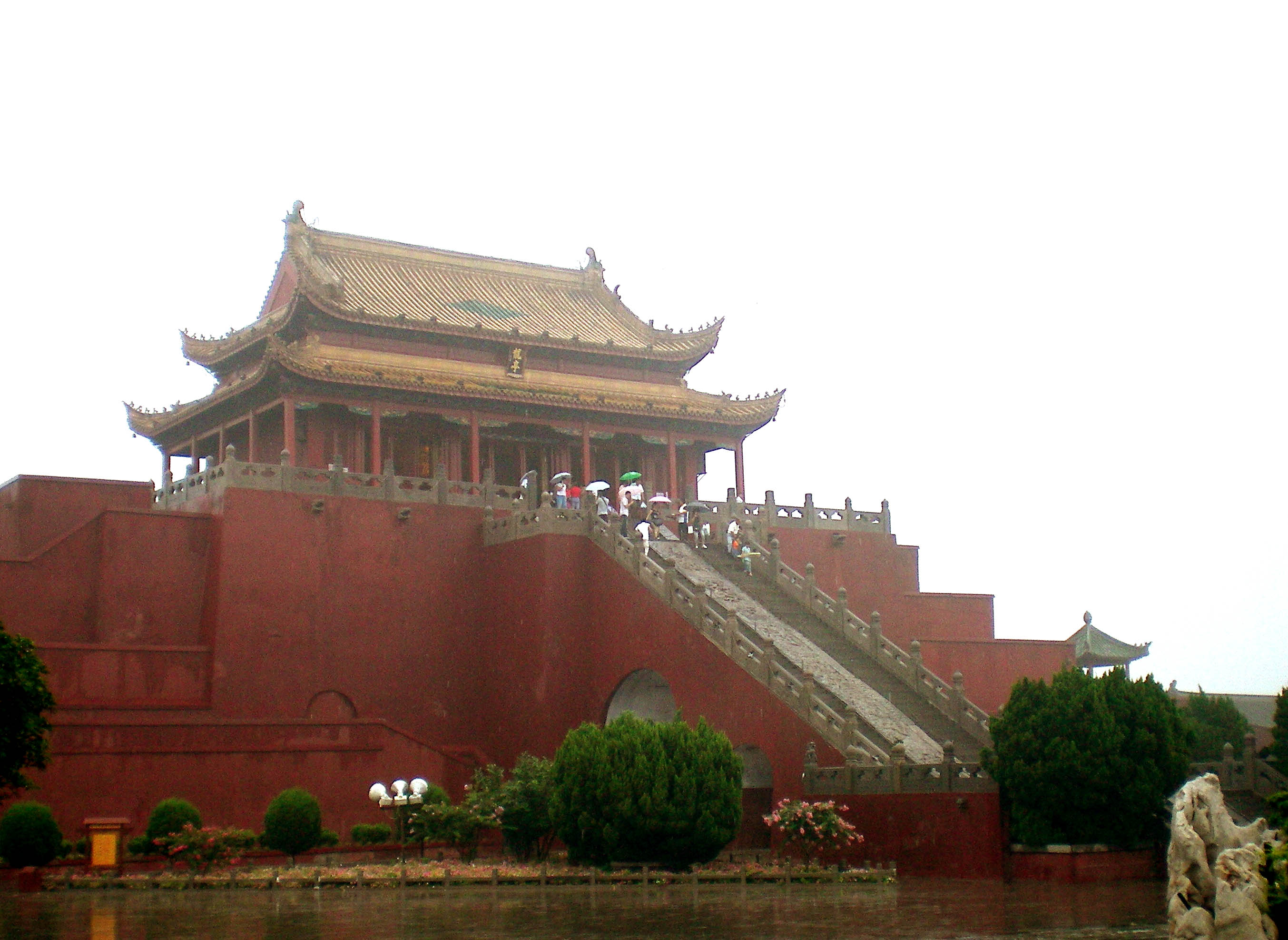

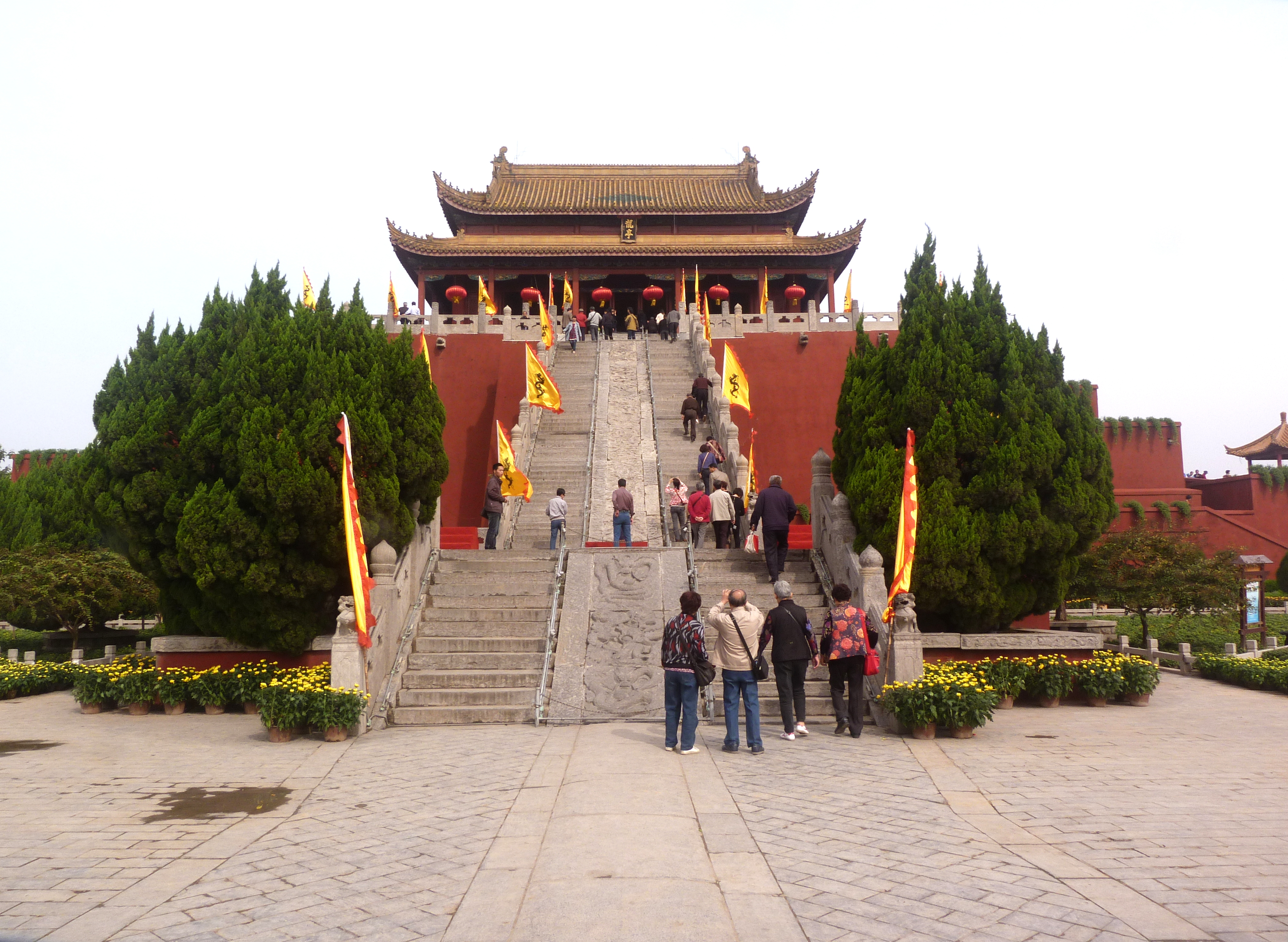

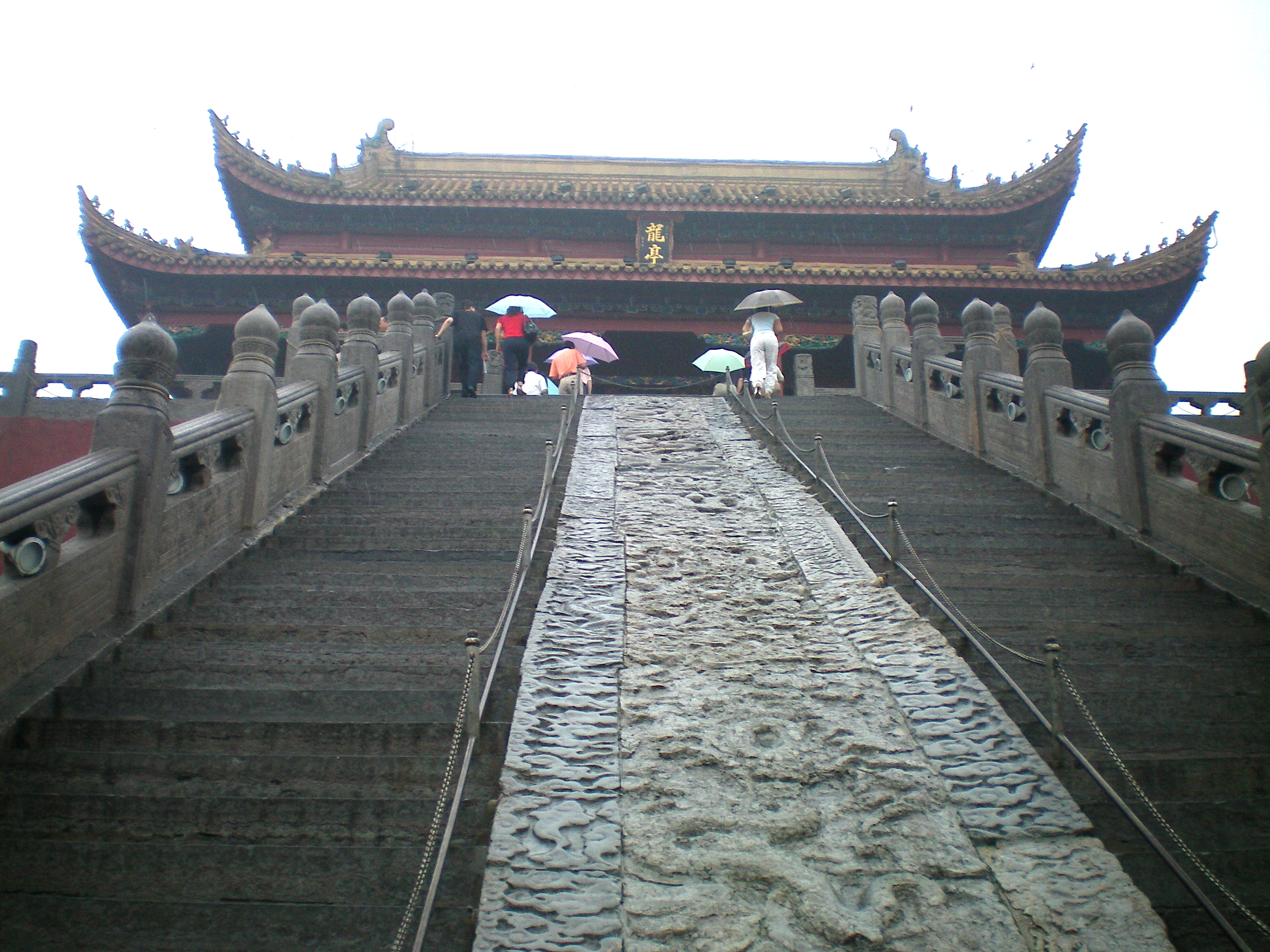

== Administrative divisions ==
As of 2012, this district is divided to 6 subdistricts, 1 town and 4 townships.

Administrative levels	Old Longting District	Former Jinming District
Subdistricts	Beidaomen Subdistrict (北道门街道)	Chengxi Subdistrict (城西街道)
	Beishudian Subdistrict (北书店街道)	Liangyuan Subdistrict (梁苑街道)
	Daxing Subdistrict (大兴街道)	-
	Xuchaomen Subdistrict (午朝门街道)	-
Towns	-	Xinghuaying (杏花营镇)
Townships	Beijiao Township (北郊乡)	Shuidao Township (水稻乡)
	Liuyuankou Township (柳园口乡)	Xijiao Township (西郊乡)
