= Daxing Township, Qianwei County =

Daxing Township 大兴乡
- Township
- Location in Sichuan
- Coordinates: 29°10′11″N 104°7′14″E
- Country: People's Republic of China
- Province: Sichuan
- Prefecture-level city: Leshan
- County: Qianwei County
- Time zone: UTC+8 (China Standard)

Daxing Township (simplified Chinese: 大兴乡; traditional Chinese: 大興鄉; pinyin: Dàxīng Xiāng) is a township under the administration of Qianwei County, Sichuan, China. As of 2018, it has one residential community and 10 villages under its administration.

== See also ==
- List of township-level divisions of Sichuan
