= Zhaoyuan County =

Coordinates: 45°31′26.36″N 124°42′05.36″E

Zhaoyuan-County 肇源县
- County
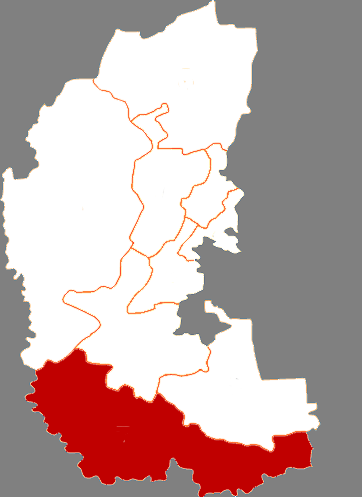
- Location of Zhaoyuan County in Daqing

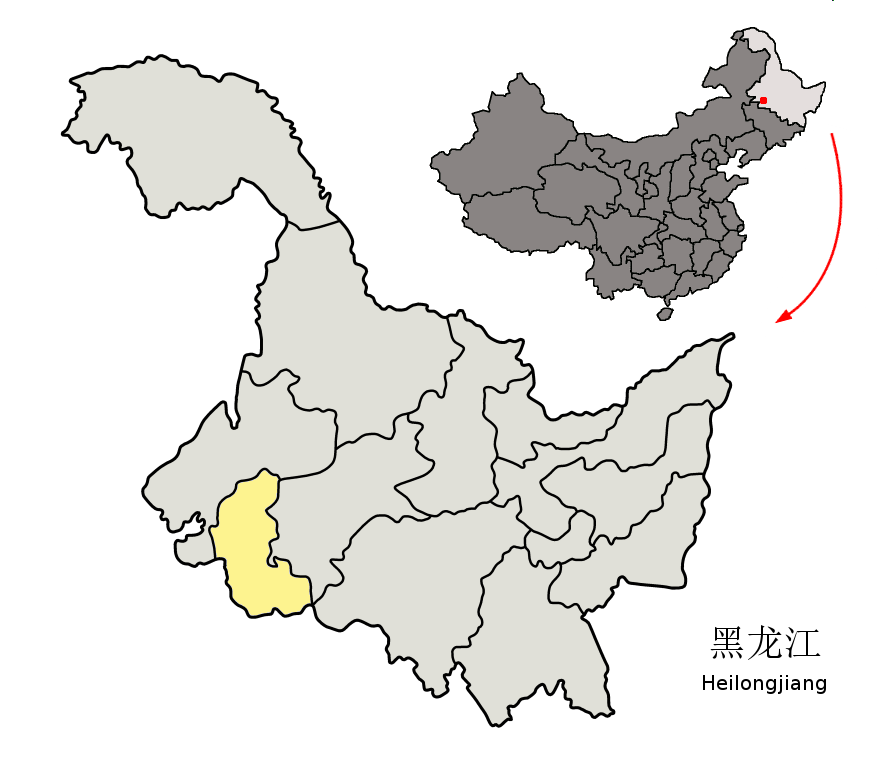
- Daqing in Heilongjiang
- Country: People's Republic of China
- Province: Heilongjiang
- Prefecture-level city: Daqing
- County seat: Zhengfu Street No. 304, Zhaoyuan Town (肇源镇政府大街304号)

Area
  - Total: 4,198 km^{2} (1,621 sq mi)

Population (2013)
  - Total: 475,800
  - Density: 113.3/km^{2} (293.5/sq mi)
- Time zone: UTC+8 (China Standard)
- Postal code: 166500
- Website: zgzy.gov.cn

Zhaoyuan County (Chinese: 肇源县; pinyin: Zhàoyuán Xiàn), formerly Rear Gorlos Banner, is a county in the west-central part of Heilongjiang Province, China, bordering Jilin province to the south. The southernmost county-level division of Daqing City, it has a land area of 4,198 km^{2} (1,621 sq mi) and a population of 450,000. The postal code is 166500. The county seat is located in Zhaoyuan Town.

Some farms in Zhaoyuan county with alkaline soil are experimenting rice cultivation with hybrid saltwater-tolerant rice.

== Administrative divisions ==
Zhaoyuan consists of 8 towns and 8 townships.

- Towns: Zhaoyuan (肇源镇), Xinzhan (新站镇), Maoxing (茂兴镇), Erzhan (二站镇), Sanzhan (三站镇), Toutai (头台镇), Gulong (古龙镇), Guqia (古恰镇)
- Townships: Minyi (民意乡), Yishun (义顺乡), Haode (浩德乡), Daxing (大兴乡), Fuxing (福兴乡), Heping (和平乡), Chaodeng (超等乡), Bohetai (薄荷台乡)

== Climate ==
Climate data for Zhaoyuan, elevation 128 m (420 ft), (1991–2020 normals, extremes 1981–2010)
Month	Jan	Feb	Mar	Apr	May	Jun	Jul	Aug	Sep	Oct	Nov	Dec	Year
Record high °C (°F)	3.9 (39.0)	13.3 (55.9)	22.8 (73.0)	31.0 (87.8)	35.3 (95.5)	37.5 (99.5)	36.9 (98.4)	36.5 (97.7)	32.2 (90.0)	30.7 (87.3)	17.8 (64.0)	9.2 (48.6)	37.5 (99.5)
Mean daily maximum °C (°F)	−10.9 (12.4)	−4.9 (23.2)	4.0 (39.2)	14.4 (57.9)	22.0 (71.6)	26.8 (80.2)	28.4 (83.1)	27.1 (80.8)	22.1 (71.8)	13.0 (55.4)	0.5 (32.9)	−9.1 (15.6)	11.1 (52.0)
Daily mean °C (°F)	−17.4 (0.7)	−11.9 (10.6)	−2.4 (27.7)	7.9 (46.2)	15.7 (60.3)	21.4 (70.5)	23.8 (74.8)	22.1 (71.8)	15.9 (60.6)	6.8 (44.2)	−4.8 (23.4)	−14.8 (5.4)	5.2 (41.4)
Mean daily minimum °C (°F)	−22.7 (−8.9)	−18.0 (−0.4)	−8.6 (16.5)	1.3 (34.3)	9.4 (48.9)	16.0 (60.8)	19.4 (66.9)	17.7 (63.9)	10.4 (50.7)	1.5 (34.7)	−9.4 (15.1)	−19.6 (−3.3)	−0.2 (31.6)
Record low °C (°F)	−40.2 (−40.4)	−40.6 (−41.1)	−27.0 (−16.6)	−10.3 (13.5)	−2.2 (28.0)	4.5 (40.1)	10.6 (51.1)	8.3 (46.9)	−0.7 (30.7)	−16.7 (1.9)	−27.3 (−17.1)	−36.1 (−33.0)	−40.6 (−41.1)
Average precipitation mm (inches)	1.9 (0.07)	2.4 (0.09)	5.9 (0.23)	12.6 (0.50)	43.5 (1.71)	82.8 (3.26)	113.6 (4.47)	89.8 (3.54)	42.8 (1.69)	16.6 (0.65)	7.8 (0.31)	4.0 (0.16)	423.7 (16.68)
Average precipitation days (≥ 0.1 mm)	2.0	3.6	4.8	9.5	11.7	12.5	10.7	8.0	5.3	4.2	4.5	6.9	83.7
Average snowy days	5.3	4.0	5.4	1.5	0.1	0	0	0	0	1.5	5.6	7.2	30.6
Average relative humidity (%)	69	61	52	48	53	65	77	78	69	62	64	70	64
Mean monthly sunshine hours	180.9	205.8	241.9	237.9	252.0	243.0	226.0	229.4	234.6	205.5	172.2	163.2	2,592.4
Percentage possible sunshine	64	70	65	58	55	52	48	53	63	61	61	60	59
Source: China Meteorological Administration
