= Daxin, Guigang =

Daxin 大新镇
- Town
- Location in Guangxi
- Coordinates: 23°18′44″N 110°27′33″E
- Country: People's Republic of China
- Autonomous region: Guangxi
- Prefecture-level city: Guigang
- County: Pingnan County
- Time zone: UTC+8 (China Standard)

Daxin (Chinese: 大新; pinyin: Dàxīn) is a town under the administration of Pingnan County, Guangxi, China. As of 2020, it has 13 villages under its administration:

- Daxin Village
- Xinhe Village (新和村)
- Dayou Village (大有村)
- Dazhong Village (大中村)
- Dawang Village (大旺村)
- Xiyi Village (西义村)
- Dali Village (大黎村)
- Guandong Village (关垌村)
- Anfu Village (安福村)
- Xinling Village (新岭村)
- Daping Village (大平村)
- Daliu Village (大榴村)
- Guwen Village (古文村)
