= Gulou South Street Mosque =

Sunni Mosque in Chengdu, Sichuan, China

- 鼓樓南街清真寺
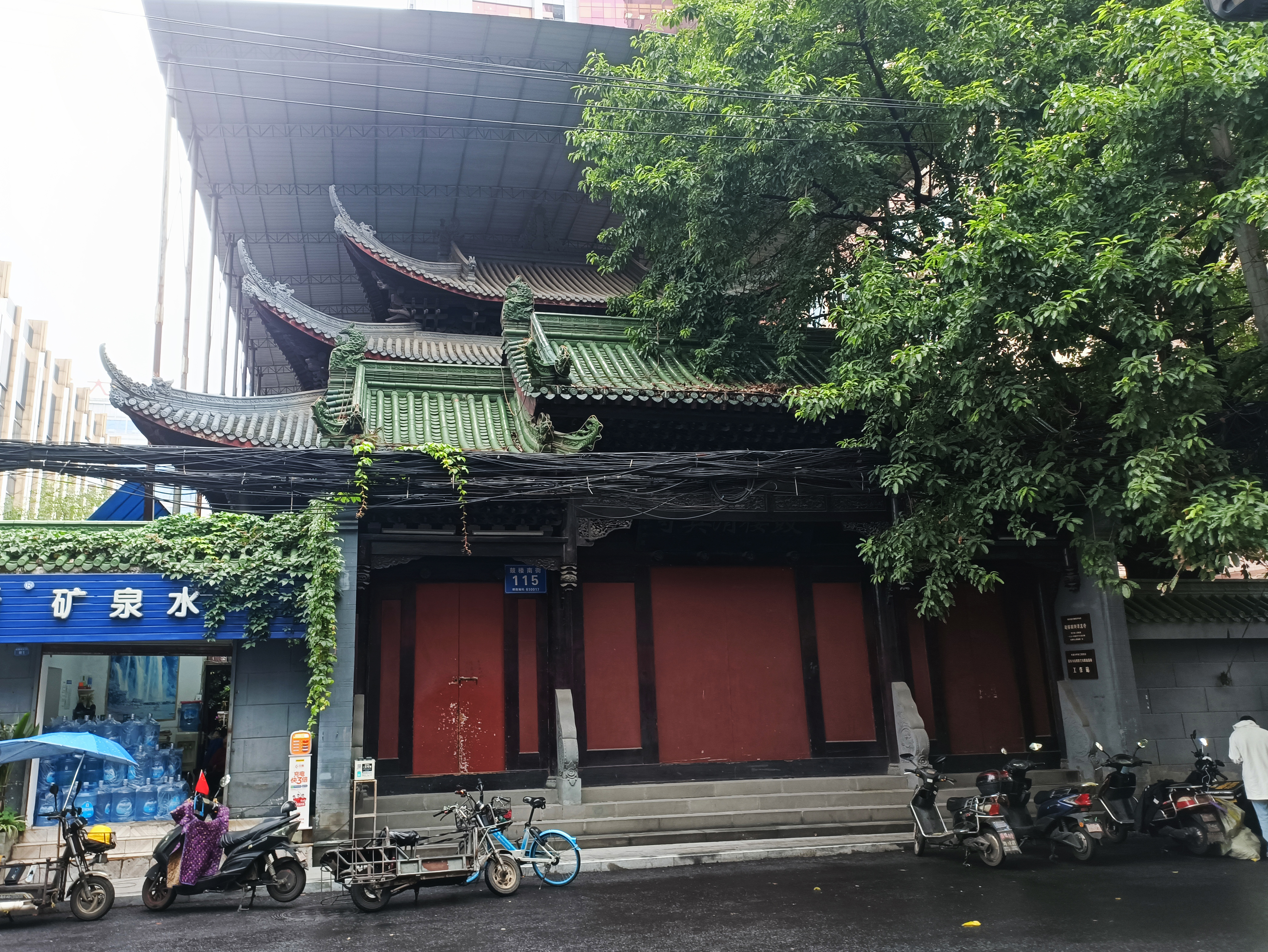
- Front door

- Location of the mosque in Sichuan

Religion
- Affiliation: Sunni Islam
- Ecclesiastical or organizational status: Mosque
- Status: Active

Location
- Location: 115 Gulou South Street, Qingyang District, Chengdu, Sichuan
- Country: China
- Interactive map of Gulou South Street Mosque
- Coordinates: 30°39′56″N 104°04′10″E

Architecture
- Type: Mosque
- Style: Juanpeng
- Completed: 1375 CE (original); 1742 and 1794 (rebuilt); c. 1940s (restored)
- Materials: Bricks; timber

The Gulou South Street Mosque (Chinese: 鼓楼南街清真寺), also known as the Gulou Mosque, is a mosque located at 155 South Street of Gulou in Chengdu, in the Sichuan province of China.

== History ==
Commenced in 1372 CE during the early Ming dynasty, the mosque was completed in 1375. At that time, Sichuan was not a major area where Muslims lived, but several mosques were still built in both the city and the countryside of Chengdu. Among them, the Gulou South Street Mosque stood out as one of the larger ones.

It was rebuilt twice during the Qing dynasty, first in 1742 and again in 1794, during the reign of the Qianlong Emperor. In 1941 the mosque suffered damage when Japanese forces bombed Chengdu during the Second Sino-Japanese War, destroying some of its structures such as the Yingge Building.

In 1981, the prayer hall of the mosque was officially listed as a Municipality Protected Historic Site. Later, in 1991, it was recognized by the Sichuan provincial government as a Provincial Cultural Heritage Site.

== Architecture ==
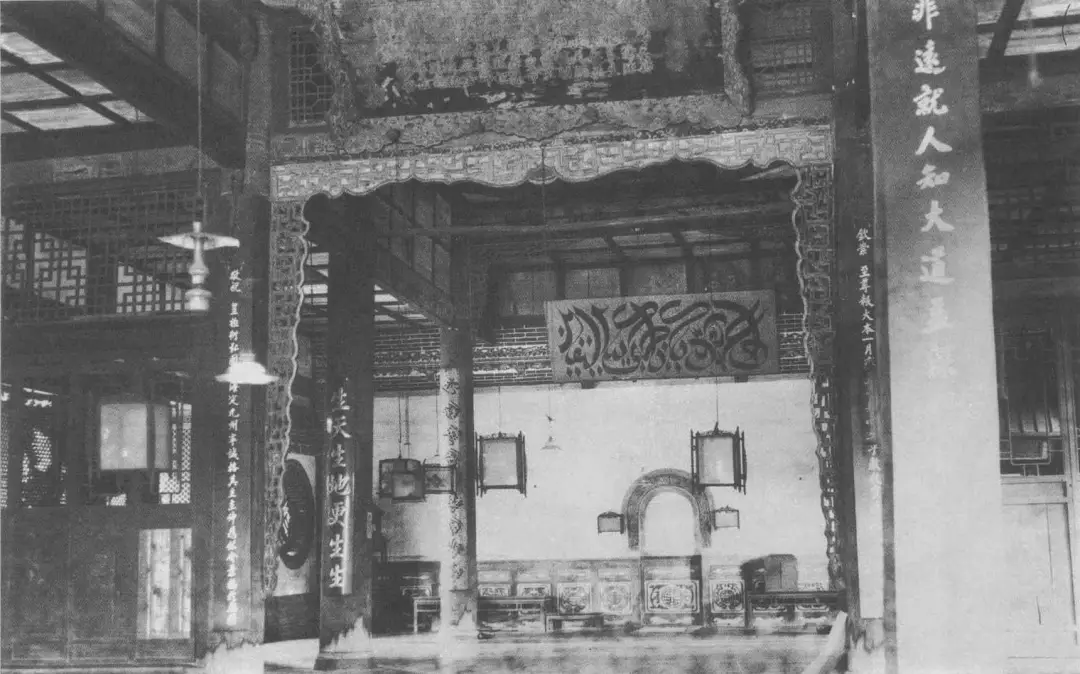
The prayer hall in 1939

The mosque's main remaining structure is its prayer hall, which is also the best-preserved historic prayer hall among the many mosques in Chengdu. The building has a rectangular layout and is surrounded by a two-layered gallery style known as Juanpeng. The entire hall is 31.55 metres (103.5 ft) long and 16.86 metres (55.3 ft) wide.

The roof has a distinctive "工"-shaped design, with the main roof sitting over the central space and two additional roofs in the front and back. The rear wall of the prayer hall is made of brick, while the other three walls are constructed using wooden lattice work featuring heart-shaped patterns and fine openwork carving. Inside, there are two rows of golden-colored wooden columns, with decorative lattice panels (Gemen) and ceiling hoods (Tianguan) in between. These features divide the space and create a calm and solemn atmosphere.

== See also ==
- Islam in China
- List of mosques in China
