= Daxing Township, Tongjiang County =

Daxing Township 大兴乡
- Township
- Location in Sichuan
- Coordinates: 31°58′18″N 107°9′30″E
- Country: People's Republic of China
- Province: Sichuan
- Prefecture-level city: Bazhong
- County: Tongjiang County
- Time zone: UTC+8 (China Standard)

Daxing Township (simplified Chinese: 大兴乡; traditional Chinese: 大興鄉; pinyin: Dàxīng Xiāng) is a township under the administration of Tongjiang County, Sichuan, China. As of 2018, it has five villages under its administration.

== See also ==
- List of township-level divisions of Sichuan
