= Daxin, Fuyang =

Daxin 大新镇
- Town
- Location in China
- Coordinates: 33°9′18″N 115°32′33″E
- Country: People's Republic of China
- Province: Anhui
- Prefecture-level city: Fuyang
- County: Taihe County
- Time zone: UTC+8 (China Standard)

Daxin (Chinese: 大新; pinyin: Dàxīn) is a town under the administration of Taihe County, Fuyang, Anhui, China. As of 2020, it has nine villages under its administration:

- Xinji Village (新集村)
- Xinzhuang Village (辛庄村)
- Guangjin Village (广缙村)
- Chantang Village (禅堂村)
- Dongmiao Village (董庙村)
- Zhanglukou Village (张路口村)
- Zhanglou Village (张楼村)
- Lige Village (李各村)
- Huayuan Village (花园村)
