= Daxing Hui Ethnic Township =

Daxing Hui Ethnic Township 大兴回族乡
- Ethnic township
- Location in Sichuan
- Coordinates: 31°15′57″N 105°25′31″E
- Country: China
- Province: Sichuan
- Prefecture-level city: Mianyang
- County: Yanting County
- Time zone: UTC+8 (China Standard)

Daxing Hui Ethnic Township (simplified Chinese: 大兴回族乡; traditional Chinese: 大興回族鄉; pinyin: Dàxīng Huí Zú Xiāng) is an ethnic township for Hui people that is under the administration of Yanting County, Sichuan, China. As of 2018, it has eight villages under its administration.

== See also ==
- Islam in Sichuan
- List of township-level divisions of Sichuan
