= Daxing, Ya'an =

Daxing 大兴镇
- Town
- Location in Sichuan
- Coordinates: 30°0′2″N 103°3′53″E
- Country: People's Republic of China
- Province: Sichuan
- Prefecture-level city: Ya'an
- District: Yucheng District
- Time zone: UTC+8 (China Standard)

Daxing (simplified Chinese: 大兴; traditional Chinese: 大興; pinyin: Dàxīng) is a town under the administration of Yucheng District, Ya'an, Sichuan, China. As of 2018, it has 14 villages under its administration.

== See also ==
- List of township-level divisions of Sichuan
