= Qi Jingyi =

Chinese Sufi master (1656–1719)

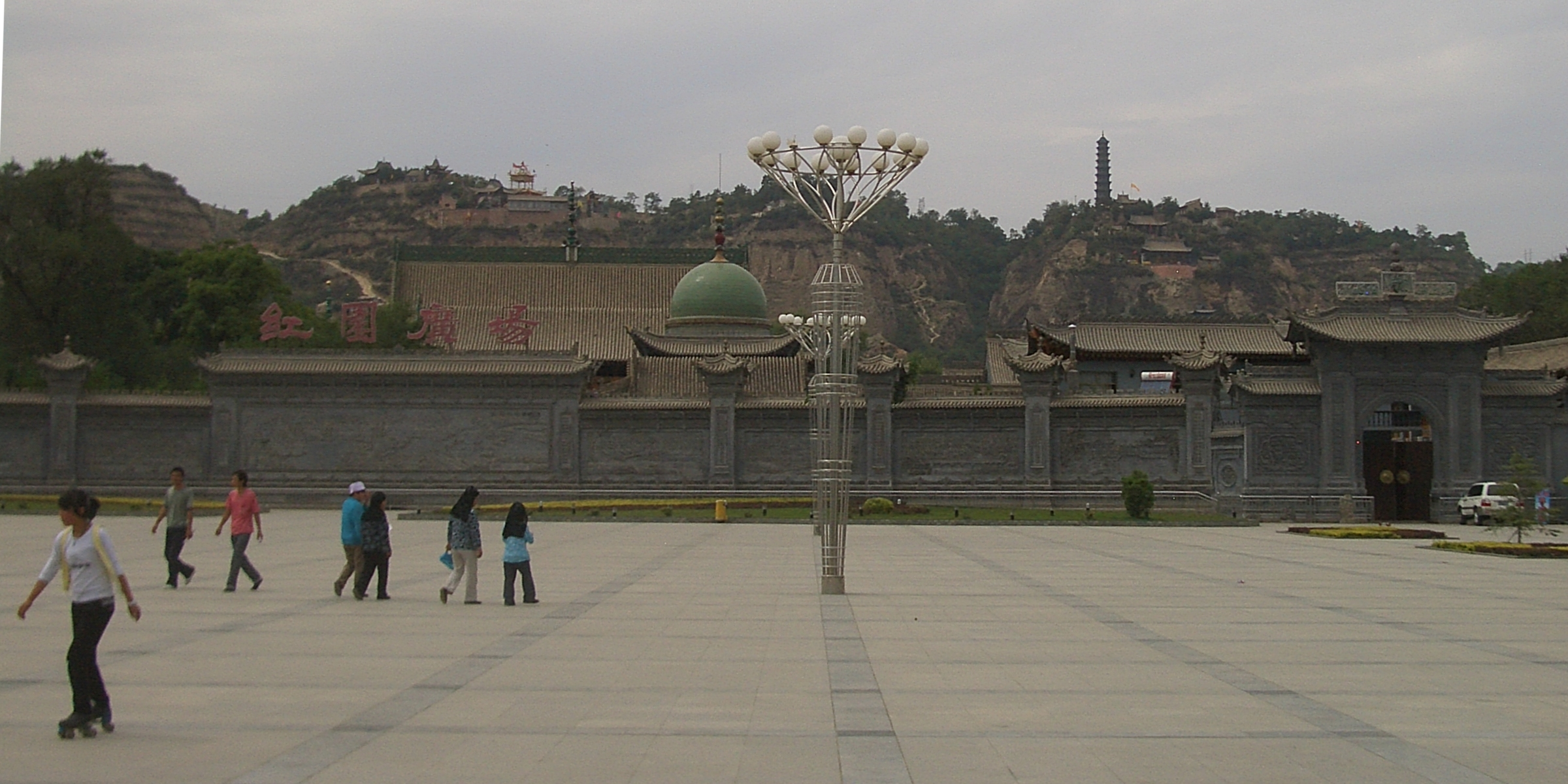
The dome of Qi Jingyi's Gongbei (mausoleum) seen over the wall of Hongyuan Park in Linxia City

Qi Jingyi (traditional Chinese: 祁靜一; simplified Chinese: 祁静一) (1656–1719), also known as Hilal al-Din, was a Chinese Sufi master, instrumental in the spread of the Qadiriyyah school among Chinese Muslims. He was known among his followers as Qi Daozu (祁道祖), i.e. Grand Master Qi.

== Life ==
According to Qi Jingyi's followers, the 16-year-old Qi Jingyi met the revered master Afaq Khwaja in Xining in 1672, and asked him to become his teacher. Afaq Khwaja supposedly said in response: "I am not your teacher; my ancient teaching is not to be passed on to you; your teacher has already crossed the Eastern Sea and arrived in the Eastern land. You must therefore return home quickly, and you will become a famous teacher in your land."

He later studied under Khwaja Sayyed Abdullāh, a 29th generation descendant of Muhammad, who had entered China in 1674.

== Death ==
Qi Jingyi's grave in Linxia City has become the center of the shrine complex known as Da Gongbei, or the "Great Tomb", which remains the center of the Qadiriyyah in China.

== See also ==
- Islam in Sichuan
