= Wuhe County =

Wuhe 五河县 Wuho
- County
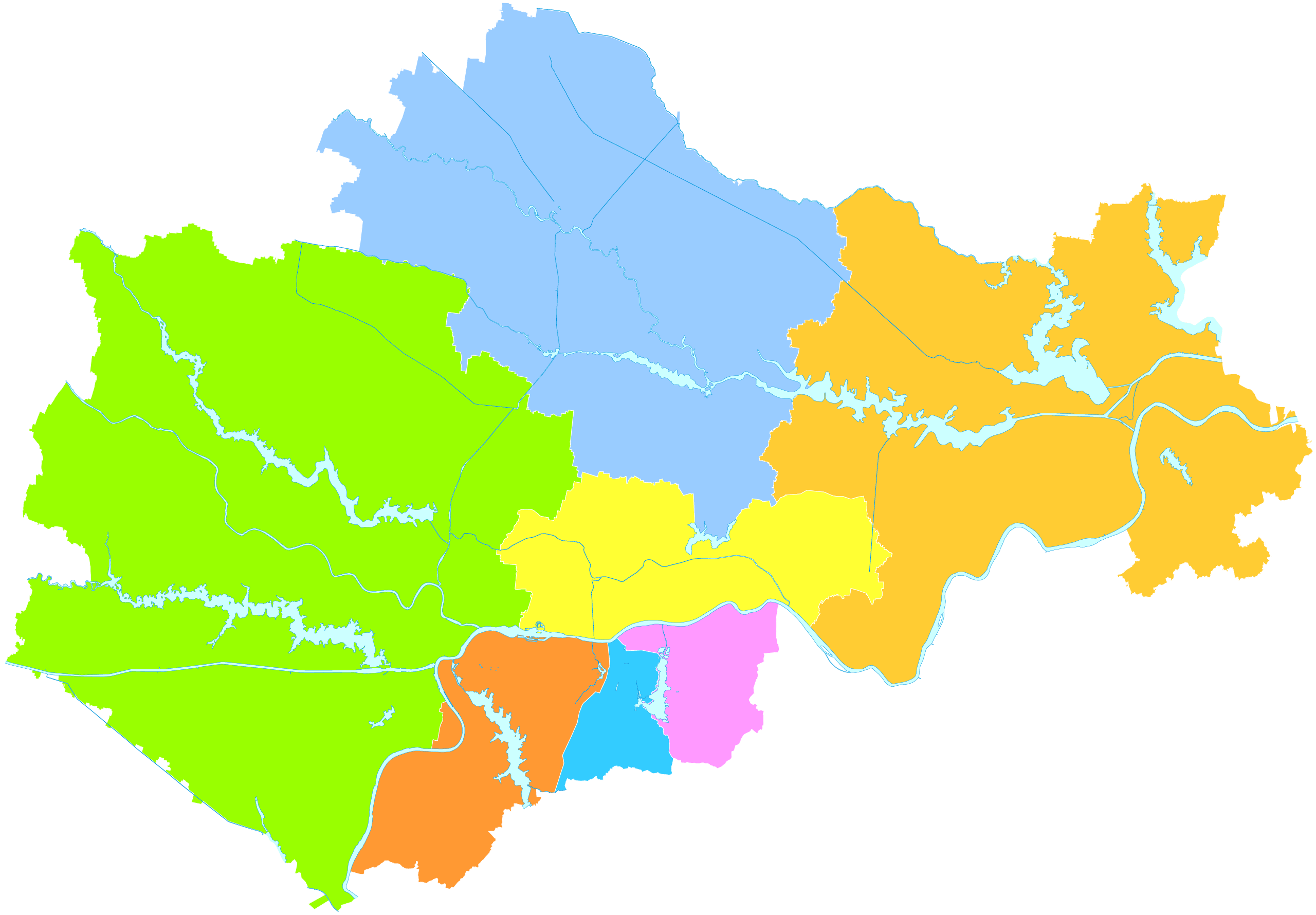
- Wuhe is the easternmost division in this map of Bengbu

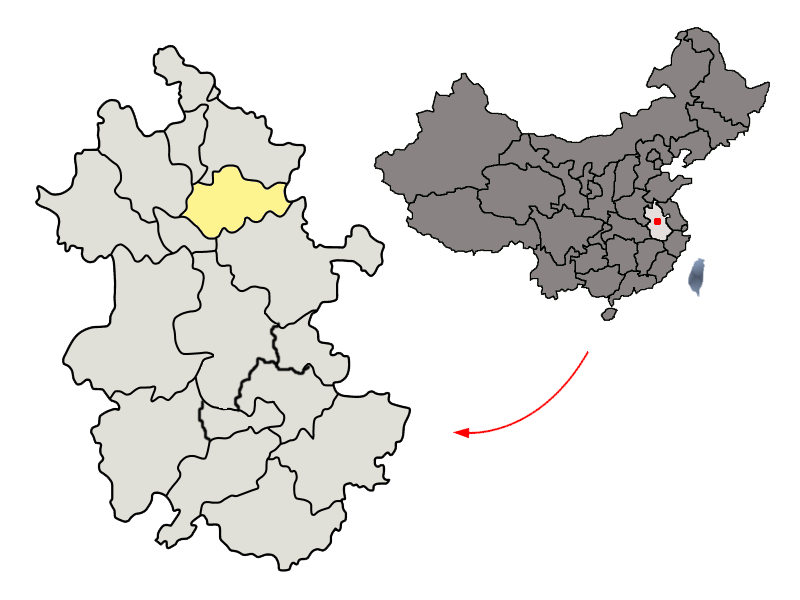
- Bengbu in Anhui
- Coordinates: 33°07′41″N 117°52′44″E
- Country: China
- Province: Anhui
- Prefecture-level city: Bengbu

Area
  - Total: 1,580 km^{2} (610 sq mi)

Population (2020)
  - Total: 523,531
  - Density: 331/km^{2} (858/sq mi)
- Time zone: UTC+8 (China Standard)
- Postal code: 233300

Wuhe County (simplified Chinese: 五河县; traditional Chinese: 五河縣; pinyin: Wǔhé Xiàn) is a county in the north of Anhui Province, China, bordering Jiangsu province to the east. It is the easternmost county-level division of the prefecture-level city of Bengbu, having an area of 1,580 square kilometres (610 sq mi) and a population of 523,531 as of the end of 2024. Its economy is based on meat production.

== Administrative divisions ==
Wuhe County has 12 towns, 1 township and 1 ethnic Township.

12 Towns

- Chengguan (城关镇)
- Xinji (新集镇)
- Xiaoxi (小溪镇)
- Shuangzhongmiao (双忠庙镇)
- Xiaowei (小圩镇)
- Dongliuji (东刘集镇)
- Toupu (头铺镇)
- Daxin (大新镇)
- Wuqiao (武桥镇)
- Zhuding (朱顶镇)
- Huinan (浍南镇)
- Shenji (申集镇)

1 Township

- Lunhu (沱湖乡)

1 Ethnic Township

- Linbei Hui Ethnic Township (临北回族乡)

== Climate ==
Climate data for Wuhe, elevation 15 m (49 ft), (1991–2020 normals, extremes 1981–present)
Month	Jan	Feb	Mar	Apr	May	Jun	Jul	Aug	Sep	Oct	Nov	Dec	Year
Record high °C (°F)	20.5 (68.9)	25.0 (77.0)	28.1 (82.6)	34.0 (93.2)	36.4 (97.5)	38.8 (101.8)	39.1 (102.4)	37.9 (100.2)	37.0 (98.6)	33.8 (92.8)	29.4 (84.9)	22.1 (71.8)	39.1 (102.4)
Mean daily maximum °C (°F)	6.2 (43.2)	9.2 (48.6)	14.5 (58.1)	21.0 (69.8)	26.2 (79.2)	29.9 (85.8)	31.7 (89.1)	30.9 (87.6)	27.2 (81.0)	22.2 (72.0)	15.4 (59.7)	8.6 (47.5)	20.2 (68.5)
Daily mean °C (°F)	1.6 (34.9)	4.4 (39.9)	9.2 (48.6)	15.4 (59.7)	20.9 (69.6)	25.1 (77.2)	27.7 (81.9)	27.0 (80.6)	22.7 (72.9)	17.1 (62.8)	10.3 (50.5)	3.9 (39.0)	15.4 (59.8)
Mean daily minimum °C (°F)	−1.9 (28.6)	0.6 (33.1)	4.9 (40.8)	10.5 (50.9)	16.1 (61.0)	21.0 (69.8)	24.6 (76.3)	24.0 (75.2)	19.1 (66.4)	12.9 (55.2)	6.3 (43.3)	0.2 (32.4)	11.5 (52.8)
Record low °C (°F)	−17.3 (0.9)	−15.6 (3.9)	−7.7 (18.1)	−0.9 (30.4)	6.0 (42.8)	11.7 (53.1)	18.2 (64.8)	15.7 (60.3)	10.0 (50.0)	0.1 (32.2)	−7.3 (18.9)	−16.8 (1.8)	−17.3 (0.9)
Average precipitation mm (inches)	30.0 (1.18)	34.5 (1.36)	50.9 (2.00)	54.4 (2.14)	73.5 (2.89)	142.1 (5.59)	218.2 (8.59)	177.8 (7.00)	87.2 (3.43)	48.9 (1.93)	39.3 (1.55)	22.9 (0.90)	979.7 (38.56)
Average precipitation days (≥ 0.1 mm)	6.0	7.4	8.2	7.6	8.2	9.1	12.2	12.0	8.0	6.9	7.3	5.7	98.6
Average snowy days	3.8	2.7	1.3	0	0	0	0	0	0	0	0.8	1.3	9.9
Average relative humidity (%)	73	72	71	71	73	74	82	83	79	74	74	72	75
Mean monthly sunshine hours	131.1	133.5	166.7	193.5	199.7	168.7	183.6	186.1	169.4	167.9	148.0	138.6	1,986.8
Percentage possible sunshine	41	43	45	49	46	40	42	45	46	48	48	45	45
Source: China Meteorological Administration all-time January high
