= Linshu County =

Linshu County 临沭县
- County
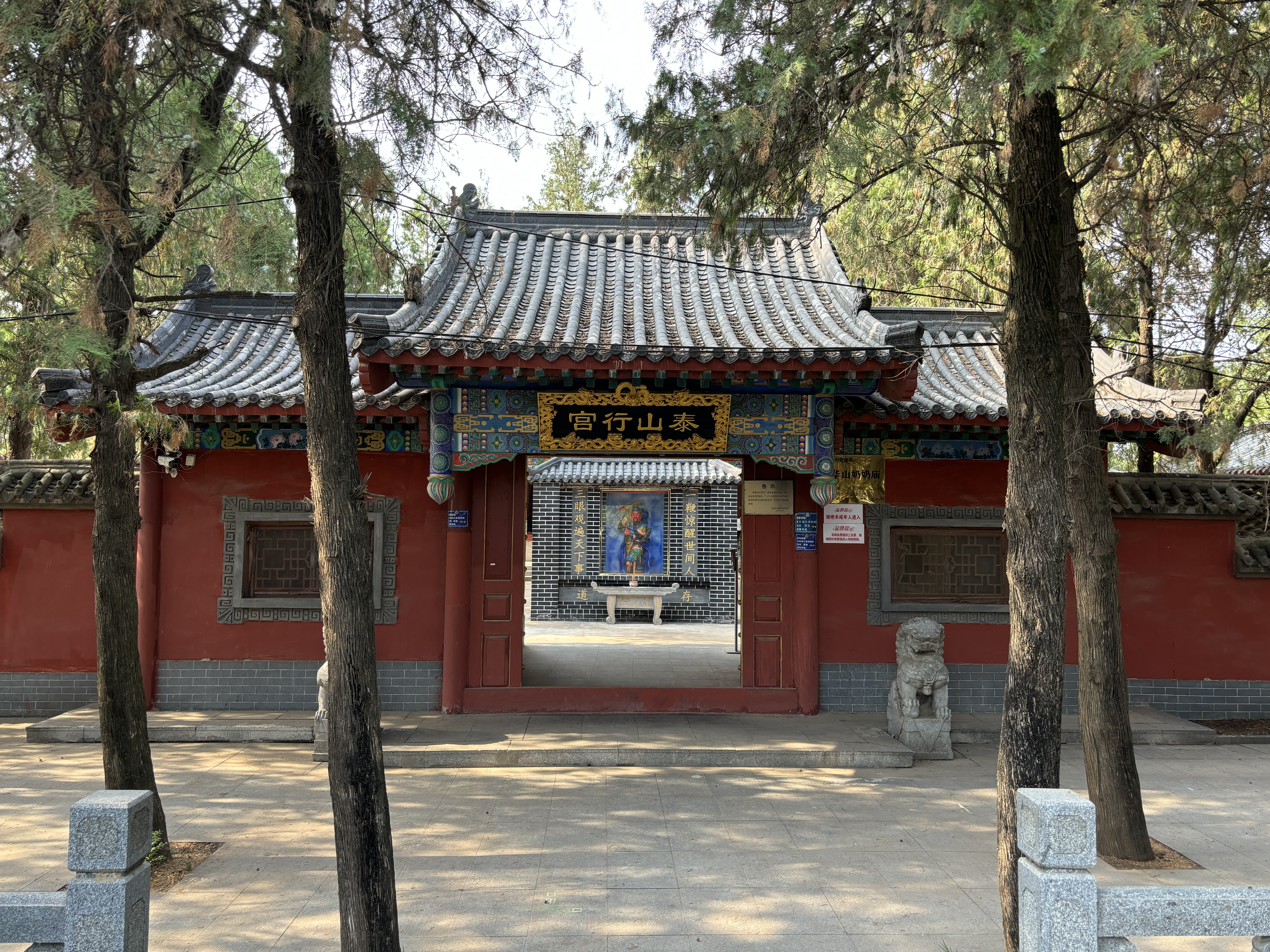
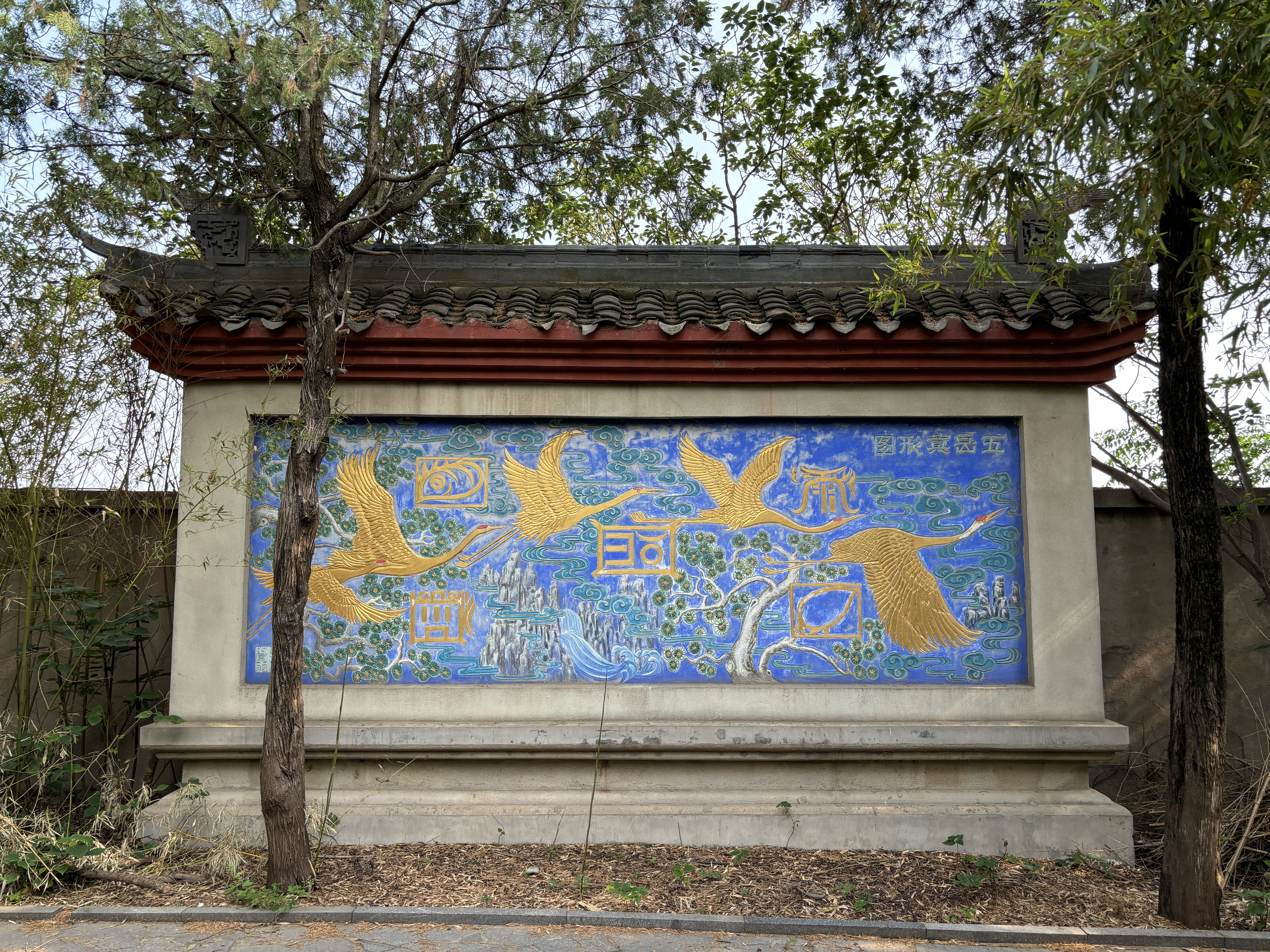
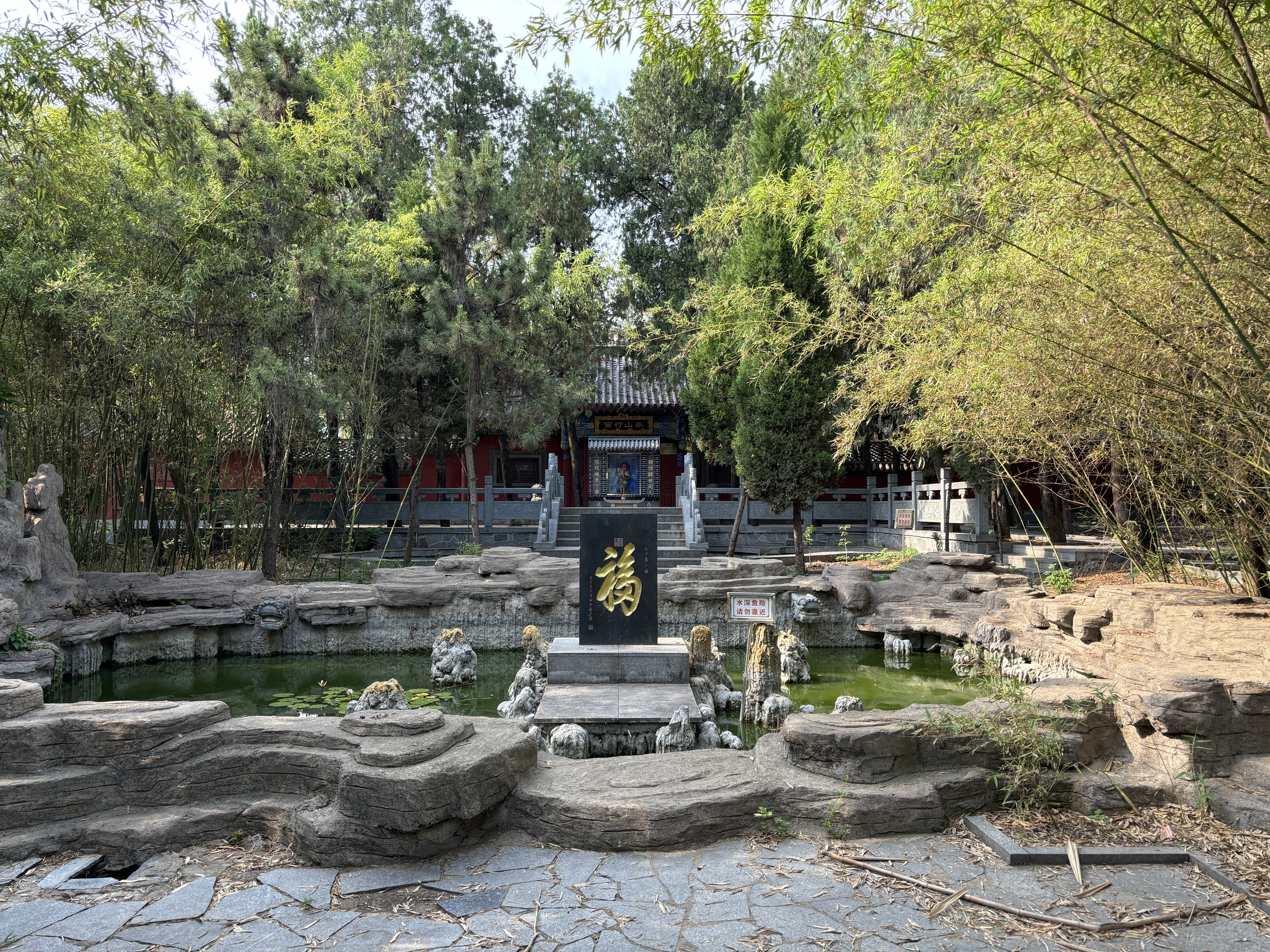

- Location in Shandong
- Coordinates: 34°55′N 118°39′E
- Country: People's Republic of China
- Province: Shandong
- Prefecture-level city: Linyi

Area
  - Total: 1,010 km^{2} (390 sq mi)
- Elevation: 60 m (200 ft)

Population (2019)
  - Total: 626,800
  - Density: 621/km^{2} (1,610/sq mi)
- Time zone: UTC+8 (China Standard)
- Postal code: 276700

Linshu County (simplified Chinese: 临沭县; traditional Chinese: 臨沭縣; pinyin: Línshù Xiàn) is a county of southern Shandong province, People's Republic of China, bordering Jiangsu province to the south and east. It is under the administration of Linyi City.

The population was 612,853 in 1999.

== Administrative divisions ==
As of 2012, this county is divided to 11 towns and 1 townships.

Towns

- Linshu (临沭镇)
- Jiaolong (蛟龙镇)
- Daxing (大兴镇)
- Shimen (石门镇)
- Caozhuang (曹庄镇)
- Nangu (南古镇)
- Zhengshan (郑山镇)
- Baimao (白旄镇)
- Qingyun (青云镇)
- Yushan (玉山镇)
- Diantou (店头镇)

Townships

- Zhucang Township (朱仓乡)

== Climate ==
Climate data for Linshu, elevation 90 m (300 ft), (1991–2020 normals, extremes 1981–present)
| Month | Jan | Feb | Mar | Apr | May | Jun | Jul | Aug | Sep | Oct | Nov | Dec | Year |
|---|---|---|---|---|---|---|---|---|---|---|---|---|---|
| Record high °C (°F) | 15.7 (60.3) | 22.4 (72.3) | 31.1 (88.0) | 33.2 (91.8) | 38.4 (101.1) | 38.0 (100.4) | 40.5 (104.9) | 37.2 (99.0) | 35.5 (95.9) | 30.8 (87.4) | 26.7 (80.1) | 19.6 (67.3) | 40.5 (104.9) |
| Mean daily maximum °C (°F) | 4.8 (40.6) | 7.9 (46.2) | 13.8 (56.8) | 20.6 (69.1) | 25.9 (78.6) | 29.2 (84.6) | 30.6 (87.1) | 29.9 (85.8) | 26.6 (79.9) | 21.3 (70.3) | 13.7 (56.7) | 6.8 (44.2) | 19.3 (66.7) |
| Daily mean °C (°F) | −0.2 (31.6) | 2.7 (36.9) | 8.0 (46.4) | 14.5 (58.1) | 20.1 (68.2) | 23.9 (75.0) | 26.4 (79.5) | 25.7 (78.3) | 21.6 (70.9) | 15.7 (60.3) | 8.5 (47.3) | 1.9 (35.4) | 14.1 (57.3) |
| Mean daily minimum °C (°F) | −4.0 (24.8) | −1.4 (29.5) | 3.0 (37.4) | 9.0 (48.2) | 15.0 (59.0) | 19.6 (67.3) | 23.1 (73.6) | 22.4 (72.3) | 17.5 (63.5) | 11.0 (51.8) | 4.1 (39.4) | −2.0 (28.4) | 9.8 (49.6) |
| Record low °C (°F) | −14.2 (6.4) | −14.8 (5.4) | −9.1 (15.6) | −1.5 (29.3) | 4.5 (40.1) | 11.9 (53.4) | 16.3 (61.3) | 12.2 (54.0) | 8.4 (47.1) | −1.7 (28.9) | −8.0 (17.6) | −13.9 (7.0) | −14.8 (5.4) |
| Average precipitation mm (inches) | 14.6 (0.57) | 19.2 (0.76) | 21.9 (0.86) | 34.0 (1.34) | 72.6 (2.86) | 92.9 (3.66) | 244.7 (9.63) | 197.6 (7.78) | 80.0 (3.15) | 30.5 (1.20) | 33.3 (1.31) | 16.7 (0.66) | 858 (33.78) |
| Average precipitation days (≥ 0.1 mm) | 4.1 | 4.7 | 4.9 | 6.8 | 7.4 | 7.5 | 13.0 | 12.2 | 7.6 | 5.3 | 5.2 | 4.1 | 82.8 |
| Average snowy days | 3.1 | 2.9 | 0.9 | 0.1 | 0 | 0 | 0 | 0 | 0 | 0 | 0.4 | 1.6 | 9 |
| Average relative humidity (%) | 66 | 65 | 60 | 60 | 65 | 71 | 82 | 83 | 77 | 70 | 69 | 66 | 70 |
| Mean monthly sunshine hours | 142.2 | 145.3 | 188.7 | 212.3 | 224.3 | 189.6 | 181.5 | 182.9 | 174.7 | 172.4 | 148.1 | 148.0 | 2,110 |
| Percentage possible sunshine | 45 | 47 | 51 | 54 | 52 | 44 | 42 | 44 | 47 | 50 | 48 | 49 | 48 |
Source: China Meteorological Administration
