= Daxin, Ningxia =

Town in Ningxia, People's Republic of China

Daxin 大新镇
- Town
- Location in Ningxia
- Coordinates: 38°26′34″N 106°18′40″E
- Country: People's Republic of China
- Autonomous region: Ningxia
- Prefecture-level city: Yinchuan
- District: Xingqing District
- Time zone: UTC+8 (China Standard)

Daxin (Chinese: 大新; pinyin: Dàxīn) is a town under the administration of Xingqing District, Yinchuan, Ningxia, China. As of 2020, it has 12 residential communities and six villages under its administration:

- Jufengyuan Community (聚丰苑社区)
- Dongchengrenjia Community (东城人家社区)
- Yinheng Community (银横社区)
- Yanxiang Community (燕祥社区)
- Yongtai Community (永泰社区)
- Xin'an Community (新安社区)
- Yanqingyuan Community (燕庆园社区)
- Yinyanyuan Community (银燕园社区)
- Yanxinyuan Community (燕欣园社区)
- Yanxiangyuan Community (燕翔园社区)
- Yanleyuan Community (燕乐园社区)
- Yanyiyuan Community (燕依园社区)
- Daxin Village
- Shangqiancheng Village (上前城村)
- Taqiao Village (塔桥村)
- Yange Village (燕鸽村)
- Xinqushao Village (新渠稍村)
- Xinshuiqiao Village (新水桥村)
