= Daxing, Yongshan County =

Daxing 大兴镇
- Town
- Location in Yunnan
- Coordinates: 27°42′18″N 103°22′51″E
- Country: People's Republic of China
- Province: Yunnan
- Prefecture-level city: Zhaotong
- County: Yongshan County
- Time zone: UTC+8 (China Standard)

Daxing (simplified Chinese: 大兴; traditional Chinese: 大興; pinyin: Dàxīng) is a town under the administration of Yongshan County, Yunnan, China. As of 2018, it has three residential communities and seven villages under its administration.
