= Daxing, Shandong =

Daxing 大兴镇
- Town
- Location in Shandong
- Coordinates: 34°47′31″N 118°42′12″E
- Country: People's Republic of China
- Province: Shandong
- Prefecture-level city: Linyi
- County: Linshu County
- Time zone: UTC+8 (China Standard)

Daxing (simplified Chinese: 大兴; traditional Chinese: 大興; pinyin: Dàxīng) is a town under the administration of Linshu County, Shandong, China. As of 2018, it has one residential community and 25 villages under its administration.
