= Daxing Subdistrict, Kaifeng =

Daxing Subdistrict 大兴街道
- Subdistrict
- Location in Henan
- Coordinates: 34°48′8″N 114°20′16″E
- Country: People's Republic of China
- Province: Henan
- Prefecture-level city: Kaifeng
- District: Longting District
- Time zone: UTC+8 (China Standard)

Daxing Subdistrict (simplified Chinese: 大兴街道; traditional Chinese: 大興街道; pinyin: Dàxīng Jiēdào) is a subdistrict in Longting District, Kaifeng, Henan, China. As of 2018, it has 2 residential communities under its administration.

== See also ==
- List of township-level divisions of Henan
