= Daxing Subdistrict, Shenyang =

Daxing Subdistrict 大兴街道
- Subdistrict
- Location in Liaoning
- Coordinates: 41°51′4″N 123°15′54″E
- Country: People's Republic of China
- Province: Liaoning
- Prefecture-level city: Shenyang
- District: Yuhong District
- Time zone: UTC+8 (China Standard)

Daxing Subdistrict (simplified Chinese: 大兴街道; traditional Chinese: 大興街道; pinyin: Dàxīng Jiēdào) is a subdistrict in Yuhong District, Shenyang, Liaoning, China. As of 2018, it has 2 residential communities and 11 villages under its administration.

== See also ==
- List of township-level divisions of Liaoning
