= Daxing, Tailai County =

Daxing 大兴镇
- Town
- Location in Heilongjiang Daxing (China)
- Coordinates: 46°52′32″N 123°44′36″E
- Country: People's Republic of China
- Province: Heilongjiang
- Prefecture-level city: Qiqihar
- County: Tailai County
- Time zone: UTC+8 (China Standard)

Daxing (simplified Chinese: 大兴; traditional Chinese: 大興; pinyin: Dàxīng) is a town under the administration of Tailai County, Heilongjiang, China. As of 2018, it has one residential community and 9 villages under its administration.
