= Daxing, Chengdu =

Daxing 大兴镇
- Town
- Location in Sichuan
- Coordinates: 30°14′39″N 103°25′2″E
- Country: People's Republic of China
- Province: Sichuan
- Prefecture-level city: Chengdu
- County: Pujiang County
- Time zone: UTC+8 (China Standard)

Daxing (simplified Chinese: 大兴; traditional Chinese: 大興; pinyin: Dàxīng) is a town under the administration of Pujiang County, Sichuan, China. As of 2018, it has one residential community and eight villages under its administration.
