= Daxing Township, Yunnan =

Daxing Township 大兴乡
- Township
- Location in Yunnan
- Coordinates: 23°48′10″N 99°48′6″E
- Country: People's Republic of China
- Province: Yunnan
- Prefecture-level city: Lincang
- Autonomous county: Gengma Dai and Va Autonomous County
- Time zone: UTC+8 (China Standard)

Daxing Township (simplified Chinese: 大兴乡; traditional Chinese: 大興鄉; pinyin: Dàxīng Xiāng) is a township under the administration of Gengma Dai and Va Autonomous County, Yunnan, China. As of 2018, it has 6 villages under its administration.
