= Daxing Township, Heilongjiang =

Daxing Township 大兴乡
- Township
- Location in Heilongjiang Daxing Township (China)
- Coordinates: 45°46′32″N 124°38′31″E
- Country: People's Republic of China
- Province: Heilongjiang
- Prefecture-level city: Daqing
- County: Zhaoyuan County
- Time zone: UTC+8 (China Standard)

Daxing Township (simplified Chinese: 大兴乡; traditional Chinese: 大興鄉; pinyin: Dàxīng Xiāng) is a township under the administration of Zhaoyuan County, Heilongjiang, China. As of 2018, it has 6 villages under its administration.
