= Miyi County =

Miyi County 米易县 • ꂯꑴꑤ • ꓟꓲ ꓬꓲꓹ ꓫꓬꓹ
- County
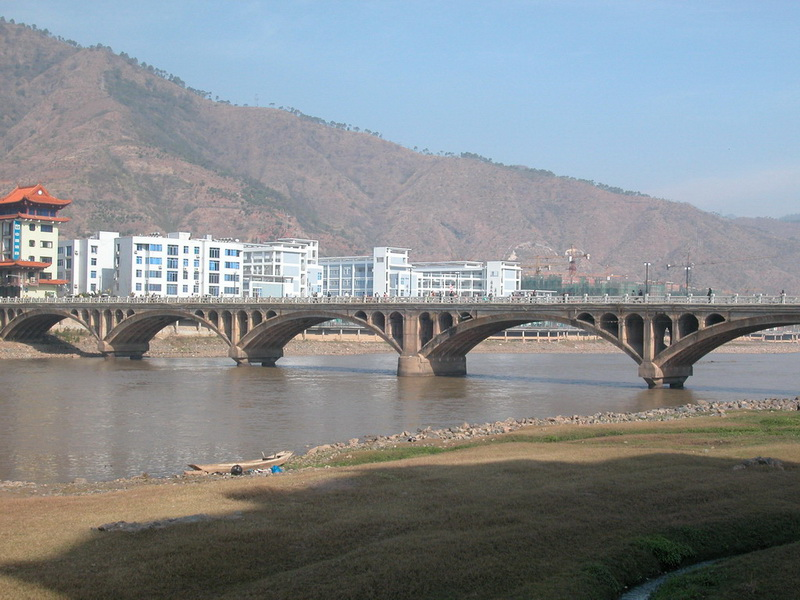
- A bridge over the Anning River

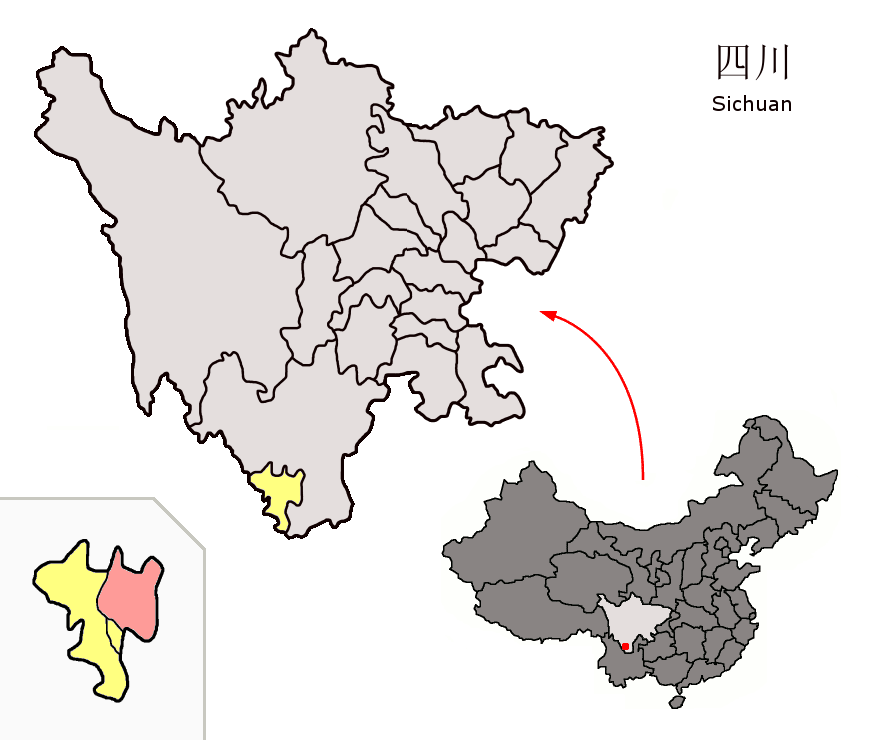
- Location of Miyi County (red) within Panzhihua City (yellow) and Sichuan
- Country: China
- Province: Sichuan
- Prefecture-level city: Panzhihua
- County seat: Panlian

Area
  - Total: 2,153 km^{2} (831 sq mi)

Population (2020 census)
  - Total: 227,011
  - Density: 105.4/km^{2} (273.1/sq mi)
- Time zone: UTC+8 (China Standard)
- Website: www.scmiyi.gov.cn

Miyi County (Chinese: 米易县; pinyin: Mǐyì Xiàn; Nuosu: ꂯꑴꑤ; Lisu: ꓟꓲ ꓬꓲꓹ ꓫꓬꓹ) is a county in the far south of Sichuan Province, China. It is under the administration of Panzhihua city.

== Administrative divisions ==
Miyi County comprises 7 towns and 4 ethnic townships.

Name	Name in native language	Romanized	Administrative division code
Towns
Panlian Town	攀莲镇 (Chinese)	Pānlián Zhèn (Chinese)	510421100
Binggu Town	丙谷镇 (Chinese)	Bǐnggǔ Zhèn (Chinese)	510421101
Deshi Town	得石镇 (Chinese)	Déshí Zhèn (Chinese)	510421102
Salian Town	撒莲镇 (Chinese)	Sālián Zhèn (Chinese)	510421103
Baima Town	白马镇 (Chinese)	Báimǎ Zhèn (Chinese)	510421105
Puwei Town	普威镇 (Chinese)	Pǔwēi Zhèn (Chinese)	510421106
Caochang Town	草场镇 (Chinese)	Cǎochǎng Zhèn (Chinese)	510421107
Ethnic townships
Wanqiu Yi Ethnic Township	湾丘彝族乡 (Chinese) ꊅꐊꆈꌠꑣ (Nuosu)	Wānqiū Yízú Xiāng (Chinese) wuo qo nuo su xie (Nuosu)	510421201
Baipo Yi Ethnic Township	白坡彝族乡 (Chinese) ꀙꁈꆈꌠꑣ (Nuosu)	Báipō Yízú Xiāng (Chinese) bip po nuo su xie (Nuosu)	510421202
Malong Yi Ethnic Township	麻陇彝族乡 (Chinese) ꃅꇉꆈꌠꑣ (Nuosu)	Málǒng Yízú Xiāng (Chinese) mu lo nuo su xie (Nuosu)	510421203
Xinshan Lisu Ethnic Township	新山傈僳族乡 (Chinese) ꓫꓰ ꓫꓺ ꓡꓲꓽ ꓢꓴ ꓞꓴ ꓫꓬ (Lisu)	Xīnshān Lìsùzú Xiāng (Chinese) xei xa lit su cu xai (Lisu)	510421204

== Climate ==
Climate data for Miyi, elevation 1,137 m (3,730 ft), (1991–2020 normals, extremes 1981–present)
Month	Jan	Feb	Mar	Apr	May	Jun	Jul	Aug	Sep	Oct	Nov	Dec	Year
Record high °C (°F)	28.6 (83.5)	31.7 (89.1)	35.9 (96.6)	37.8 (100.0)	40.3 (104.5)	39.5 (103.1)	38.8 (101.8)	36.9 (98.4)	35.9 (96.6)	33.4 (92.1)	32.9 (91.2)	27.7 (81.9)	40.3 (104.5)
Mean daily maximum °C (°F)	21.8 (71.2)	24.7 (76.5)	28.6 (83.5)	31.3 (88.3)	32.6 (90.7)	31.9 (89.4)	30.8 (87.4)	30.6 (87.1)	28.5 (83.3)	26.5 (79.7)	23.9 (75.0)	21.2 (70.2)	27.7 (81.9)
Daily mean °C (°F)	12.1 (53.8)	15.5 (59.9)	19.9 (67.8)	23.0 (73.4)	25.1 (77.2)	25.6 (78.1)	25.0 (77.0)	24.5 (76.1)	22.4 (72.3)	19.8 (67.6)	15.5 (59.9)	11.9 (53.4)	20.0 (68.0)
Mean daily minimum °C (°F)	5.4 (41.7)	8.1 (46.6)	12.4 (54.3)	15.9 (60.6)	19.0 (66.2)	21.1 (70.0)	21.3 (70.3)	20.9 (69.6)	19.1 (66.4)	16.0 (60.8)	10.5 (50.9)	6.3 (43.3)	14.7 (58.4)
Record low °C (°F)	−0.2 (31.6)	1.2 (34.2)	1.8 (35.2)	6.7 (44.1)	10.1 (50.2)	13.8 (56.8)	15.6 (60.1)	14.9 (58.8)	11.9 (53.4)	9.5 (49.1)	2.0 (35.6)	−1.9 (28.6)	−1.9 (28.6)
Average precipitation mm (inches)	7.9 (0.31)	7.1 (0.28)	10.9 (0.43)	21.0 (0.83)	68.4 (2.69)	206.9 (8.15)	245.8 (9.68)	186.8 (7.35)	202.0 (7.95)	93.8 (3.69)	16.3 (0.64)	3.0 (0.12)	1,069.9 (42.12)
Average precipitation days (≥ 0.1 mm)	2.7	2.5	3.5	5.7	10.4	16.7	20.4	17.8	16.7	11.8	4.1	1.7	114
Average snowy days	0.1	0	0	0	0	0	0	0	0	0	0	0	0.1
Average relative humidity (%)	61	48	41	44	52	68	78	78	80	77	73	70	64
Mean monthly sunshine hours	226.6	227.6	266.1	261.5	239.4	171.6	152.3	168.9	139.2	175.9	196.3	201.6	2,427
Percentage possible sunshine	68	71	71	68	57	42	36	42	38	50	61	62	56
Source: China Meteorological Administrationall-time November record high
