= Baima, Miyi County =

Baima 白马镇
- Town
- Location in Sichuan
- Coordinates: 27°00′49″N 102°09′50″E
- Country: People's Republic of China
- Province: Sichuan
- Prefecture-level city: Panzhihua
- County: Miyi
- Village-level divisions: 1 residential community 9 villages
- Elevation: 1,155 m (3,789 ft)
- Time zone: UTC+8 (China Standard)
- Area code: 0812

Baima (simplified Chinese: 白马; traditional Chinese: 白馬; pinyin: Báimǎ; lit. 'white horse') is a town of northeastern Miyi County in southern Sichuan province, China, situated 14 kilometres (8.7 mi) north-northeast of the county seat along G5 Beijing–Kunming Expressway. The registered population of the town was 30,996 at the end of 2018. As of 2020, it administers Guabang Residential Community (挂榜社区) and the following nine villages:

- Guabang Village (挂榜村)
- Huangcao Village (黄草村)
- Tianba Village (田坝村)
- Tianjia Village (田家村)
- Weilong Village (威龙村)
- Mabinglang Village (马槟榔村)
- Longtang Village (龙塘村)
- Zongshuwan Village (棕树湾村)
- Gaolong Village (高龙村)
