= Chengbei (disambiguation) =

Chengbei (城北区) is a district of Xining, Qinghai, People's Republic of China (PRC).

Chengbei (Chinese: 城北; lit. 'city north') may also refer to the following locations in the PRC:

== Towns ==
- Chengbei, Meizhou, in Meijiang District, Meizhou, Guangdong
- Chengbei, Fuchuan County, in Fuchuan Yao Autonomous County, Guangxi
- Chengbei, Jiange County, Sichuan
- Chengbei, Linshui County, Sichuan

== Townships ==
- Chengbei Township, Anhui, in Jin'an District, Lu'an
- Chengbei Township, Chongqing, in Liangping County
- Chengbei Township, Guangdong, in Xuwen County
- Chengbei Township, Jiangsu, in Hanjiang District, Yangzhou
- Chengbei Township, Anyue County, Sichuan
- Chengbei Township, Zhaojue County, Sichuan
- Chengbei Township, Zhejiang, in Longquan

== Subdistricts ==
- Chengbei Subdistrict, Beijing, in Changping District, Beijing
- Chengbei Subdistrict, Fu'an, Fujian
- Chengbei Subdistrict, Linxia City, Gansu
- Chengbei Subdistrict, Lianjiang, Guangdong
- Chengbei Subdistrict, Yangjiang, in Jiangcheng District, Yangjiang, Guangdong
- Chengbei Subdistrict, Zhaoqing, in Duanzhou District, Zhaoqing, Guangdong
- Chengbei Subdistrict, Beiliu, Guangxi
- Chengbei Subdistrict, Laibin, in Xingbin District, Laibin, Guangxi
- Chengbei Subdistrict, Wuzhou, in Wanxiu District, Wuzhou, Guangxi
- Chengbei Subdistrict, Yulin, Guangxi, in Yuzhou District, Yulin, Guangxi
- Chengbei Subdistrict, Xingren County, Guizhou
- Chengbei Subdistrict, Zhoukou, in Chuanhui District, Zhoukou, Henan
- Chengbei Subdistrict, Yingcheng, Xiaoning, Hubei
- Chengbei Subdistrict, Changde, in Wuling District, Changde, Hunan
- Chengbei Subdistrict, Huaihua, in Hecheng District, Huaihua, Hunan
- Chengbei Subdistrict, Suzhou, in Gusu District (formerly Pingjiang District), Suzhou, Jiangsu
- Chengbei Subdistrict, Taizhou, Jiangsu, in Hailing District
- Chengbei Subdistrict, Xinyu, in Yushui District, Xinyu, Jiangxi
- Chengbei Subdistrict, Lüliang, in Lishi District, Lüliang, Shanxi
- Chengbei Subdistrict, Yongji, Shanxi
- Chengbei Subdistrict, Deyang, in Jingyang District, Deyang, Sichuan
- Chengbei Subdistrict, Mianyang, in Fucheng District, Mianyang, Sichuan
- Chengbei Subdistrict, Shigatse, Tibet
- Chengbei Subdistrict, Jinhua, in Wucheng District, Jinhua, Zhejiang
- Chengbei Subdistrict, Wenling, Zhejiang
- Chengbei Road Subdistrict, Shaoyang, in Daxiang District, Shaoyang, Hunan
- Chengbei Road Subdistrict, Zibo, in Zhoucun District, Zibo, Shandong
- Chengbei Subdistrict, Yarkant County, Kashgar Prefecture, Xinjiang

== Villages ==
- Chengbei, Wenquan, Yingshan County, Huanggang, Hubei
