= 城南 =

城南 (lit. 'south of a castle/city'; pinyin: Chéngnán; Revised Romanization of Korean: Seongnam; Hepburn romanization: Jōnan) may refer to:

- Seongnam, a city in South Korea
- Chengnan, a subdistrict of Qianjiang District, Chongqing, People's Republic of China
- Chengnan, a subdistrict of Chaoyang District, Shantou, PRC
- Jōnan-ku, Fukuoka, a ward of Fukuoka, Japan
- Jōnan, Kumamoto, a former town of Kumamoto Prefecture, Japan

== See also ==
- Chengbei (disambiguation) "the north of a castle/city"
- 城東區 (disambiguation) "the east of a castle/city"
