= Qingbei =

Qingbei may refer to:

- Qingbei (青背乡), township in Jiaohe, Jilin, China
- Qingbei (青陂村), village in Tanshi, Xiangxiang, Xiangtan, Hunan, China
- "Qīngbēi" (倾杯), 2018 single by Chinese girl group Super Impassioned Net Generation

== See also ==
- Qinbei District, Qinzhou, Guangxi, China
- Qingbai ware, a type of Chinese porcelain
- Chengbei (disambiguation)
