= 河州 =

河州 may refer to:

- Hezhou (Gansu), modern Linxia City
- Hezhou, Hunan, a town in Qidong County, Hunan
- Kawachi Province, abbreviated name was Kashū (河州), province of Japan located in what is today Osaka Prefecture
