= Huasi Mosque =

Mosque in Linxia, Gansu, China

- 華寺清真寺
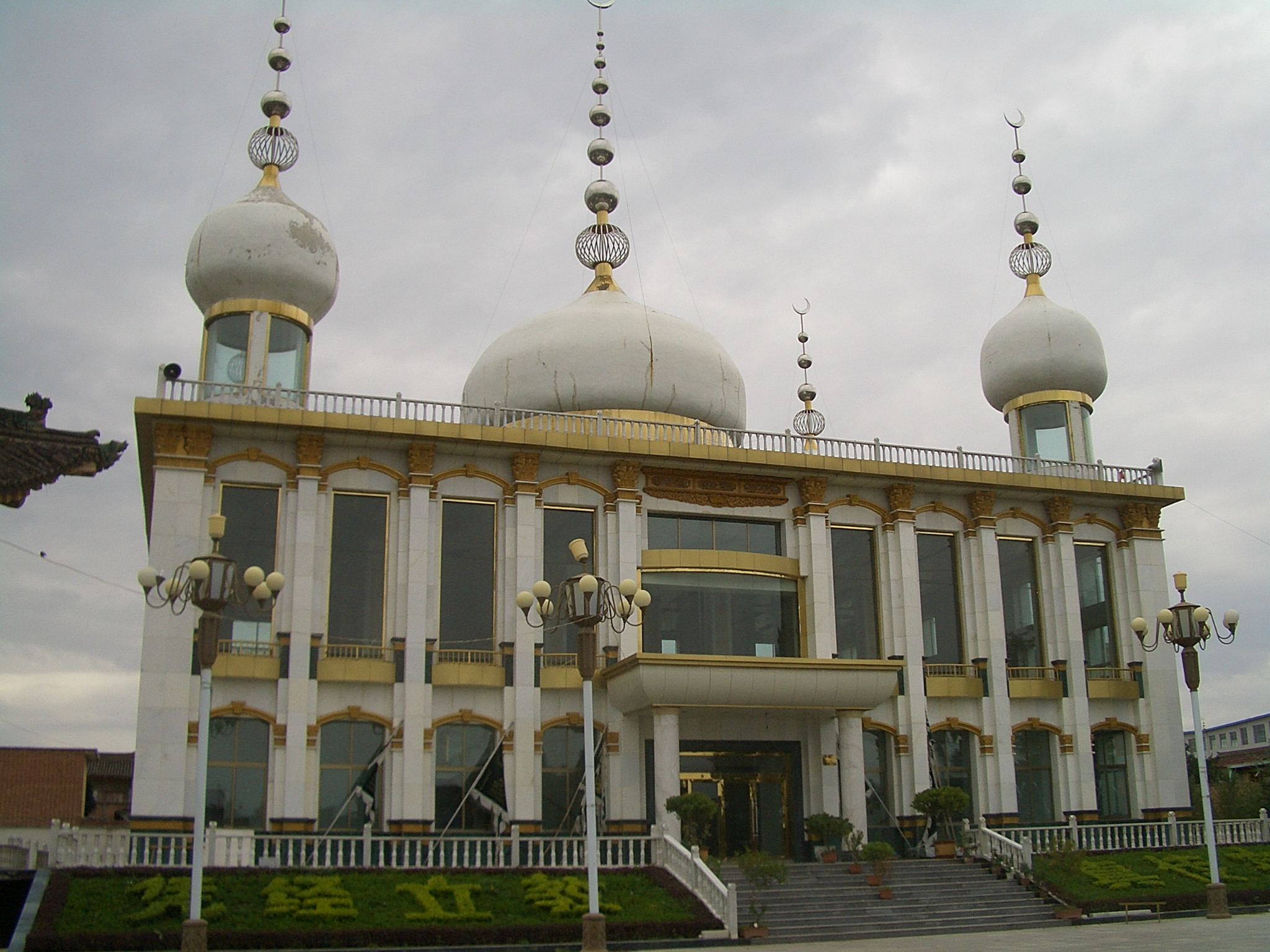

- Location of the mosque in Gansu

Religion
- Affiliation: Sunni Islam
- Ecclesiastical or organizational status: Mosque
- Status: Active

Location
- Location: Linxia, Gansu
- Country: China
- Interactive map of Huasi Mosque
- Coordinates: 35°35′17.6″N 103°11′59.7″E

Architecture
- Type: Mosque
- Completed: c. 1465–1487
- Dome: 4 (maybe more)

The Huasi Mosque (Chinese: 华寺清真寺; pinyin: Huá Sì Qīng Zhēn Sì; lit. 'Multicoloured Mosque') is a mosque located in Linxia City, Gansu, China.

== Overview ==
The mosque was built during the reign of the Chenghua Emperor (r. 1465–1487) in the Ming dynasty. Buddhist temples and imperial palaces were the architecture on which the construction for the mosque was based. It was constructed by Muslims living in West Phoenix Wood Town, now the Bafang areas of Linxia City. Ma Zhongying's 1928 revolt in the Muslim conflict in Gansu led to a blaze that destroyed the building. The mosque was reconstructed in 1941 and is capable of holding 2,000 people and is 5 square metres (54 sq ft) in area.

== See also ==
- Islam in China
- List of mosques in China
- Linxia prefecture
