= Chengbei Subdistrict, Linxia City =

Chengbei Subdistrict 城北街道
- Subdistrict
- Location relative to Qinghai
- Coordinates: 35°36′13″N 103°12′40″E
- Country: People's Republic of China
- Province: Gansu
- Autonomous prefecture: Linxia
- County-level city: Linxia
- Village-level divisions: 6 residential communities
- Elevation: 1,888 m (6,194 ft)
- Time zone: UTC+8 (China Standard)
- Postal code: 731000
- Area code: 0930

Chengbei Subdistrict (Chinese: 城北街道; pinyin: Chéngběi Jiēdào; lit. 'city north') is a subdistrict in the heart of Linxia City, Gansu, People's Republic of China. As of 2011, it has six residential communities (居委会) under its administration.

== See also ==
- List of township-level divisions of Gansu
