= Laohua Mosque =

Mosque in Linxia, Gansu, China

- 清真老华寺
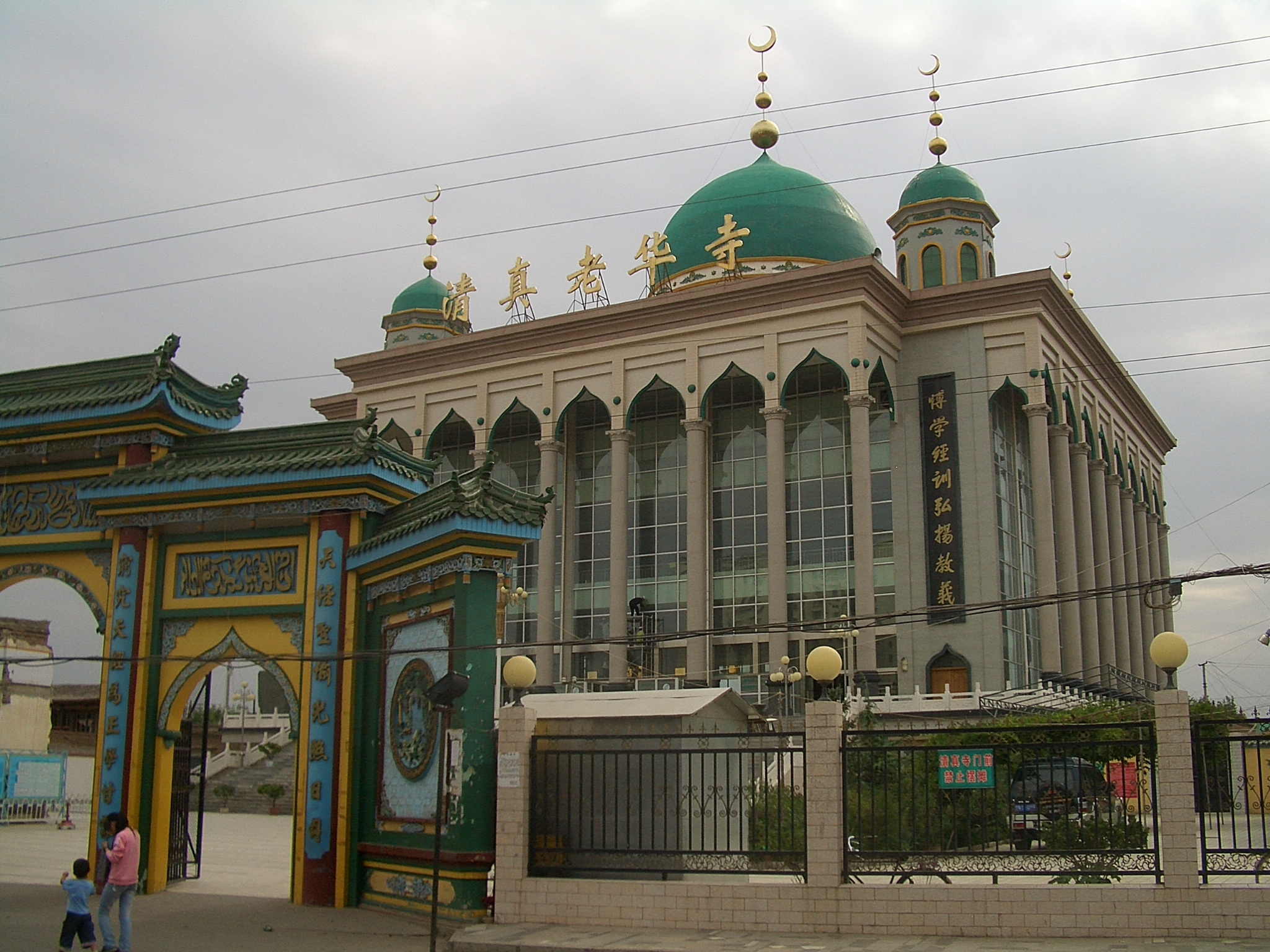

- Location of the mosque in Gansu

Religion
- Affiliation: Sunni Islam
- Ecclesiastical or organizational status: Mosque
- Status: Active

Location
- Location: Linxia City, Linxia Prefecture, Gansu
- Country: China
- Interactive map of Laohua Mosque
- Coordinates: 35°35′31.5″N 103°12′9.9″E

Architecture
- Type: Mosque
- Completed: 1368
- Dome: 1 (maybe more)

The Laohua Mosque (Chinese: 清真老华寺; pinyin: Qīngzhēn Lǎohuá Sì) is a mosque in Linxia City, Linxia Hui Autonomous Prefecture, Gansu Province, China.

== Overview ==
The mosque was built in 1368 during the reign of Hongwu; with its roof styled in the Chinese architectural style.

== See also ==
- Islam in China
- List of mosques in China
