= Chengbei, Jiange County =

Chengbei 城北镇
- Town
- Location in Sichuan
- Coordinates: 32°02′48″N 105°27′44″E
- Country: People's Republic of China
- Province: Sichuan
- Prefecture-level city: Guangyuan
- County: Jiange
- Elevation: 513 m (1,683 ft)
- Time zone: UTC+8 (China Standard)

Chengbei (Chinese: 城北; pinyin: Chéngběi; lit. 'city north') is a town of Jiange County in northeastern Sichuan province, China, located 27 kilometres (17 mi) south of the county seat. As of 2011, it has 17 villages under its administration.

== See also ==
- List of township-level divisions of Sichuan
