= Chengbei, Linshui County =

Chengbei 城北镇
- Town
- Location in Sichuan
- Coordinates: 30°21′14″N 106°56′05″E
- Country: People's Republic of China
- Province: Sichuan
- Prefecture-level city: Guang'an
- County: Linshui
- Elevation: 344 m (1,129 ft)
- Time zone: UTC+8 (China Standard)
- Postal code: 638500
- Area code: 0826

Chengbei (Chinese: 城北; pinyin: Chéngběi; lit. 'city north') is a town of Linshui County in eastern Sichuan province, China, located immediately north of the county seat. As of 2011, it has one residential community (社区) and 27 villages under its administration.

== See also ==
- List of township-level divisions of Sichuan
