= Chengbei Township, Anyue County =

Chengbei Township 城北乡
- Township
- Location in Sichuan
- Coordinates: 30°08′16″N 105°20′29″E
- Country: People's Republic of China
- Province: Sichuan
- Prefecture-level city: Ziyang
- County: Anyue
- Elevation: 305 m (1,001 ft)
- Time zone: UTC+8 (China Standard)

Chengbei (Chinese: 城北; pinyin: Chéngběi; lit. 'city north') is a township of Anyue County in eastern Sichuan province, China, situated immediately north of the county seat. As of 2011, it has 13 villages under its administration.

== See also ==
- List of township-level divisions of Sichuan
