= Chengbei Road Subdistrict, Zibo =

Chengbei Road Subdistrict 城北路街道
- Subdistrict
- Location in Shandong
- Coordinates: 36°50′16″N 117°51′57″E
- Country: People's Republic of China
- Province: Shandong
- Prefecture-level city: Zibo
- District: Zhoucun
- Elevation: 35 m (115 ft)
- Time zone: UTC+8 (China Standard)
- Postal code: 255300
- Area code: 0533

Chengbei Road Subdistrict (Chinese: 城北路街道; pinyin: Chéngběi Jiēdào; lit. 'city north road') is a subdistrict of Zhoucun District, Zibo, Shandong, People's Republic of China, located in the northern part of the district and in the western suburbs of Zibo. As of 2011, it has 16 residential communities (社区) under its administration.

== See also ==
- List of township-level divisions of Shandong
