= Chengbei Subdistrict, Mianyang =

Chengbei Subdistrict 城北街道
- Subdistrict
- Location in Sichuan
- Coordinates: 31°27′50″N 104°44′15″E
- Country: People's Republic of China
- Province: Sichuan
- Prefecture-level city: Mianyang
- District: Fucheng
- Elevation: 463 m (1,519 ft)
- Time zone: UTC+8 (China Standard)

Chengbei Subdistrict (Chinese: 城北街道; pinyin: Chéngběi Jiēdào; lit. 'city north') is a subdistrict of Fucheng District, Mianyang, Sichuan, People's Republic of China, occupying the northern portion of the district as its name suggests. As of 2011, it has 13 residential communities (社区) under its administration.

== See also ==
- List of township-level divisions of Sichuan
