= Chengbei Subdistrict, Changde =

Chengbei Subdistrict 城北街道
- Subdistrict
- Interactive map of Chengbei Subdistrict
- Coordinates: 29°02′41″N 111°41′53″E
- Country: People's Republic of China
- Province: Hunan
- Prefecture-level city: Changde
- District: Wuling
- Village-level divisions: 9 residential communities
- Elevation: 35 m (115 ft)
- Time zone: UTC+8 (China Standard)
- Area code: 0736

Chengbei Subdistrict (Chinese: 城北街道; pinyin: Chéngběi Jiēdào; lit. 'city north') is a subdistrict of Wuling District, Changde, Hunan, People's Republic of China. As of 2011, it has four residential communities (居委会) and three villages under its administration.
