= 城東區 =

城東區 (Traditional Chinese), 城东区 (Simplified Chinese), 城東区 (Shinjitai) may refer to:

- Chengdong District, one of the five districts of Xining, People's Republic of China
- Jōtō-ku, Osaka, one of the 24 wards of Osaka, Japan
- Jōtō, a ward in Tokyo City, now part of Kōtō, Tokyo, Japan
- Seongdong-gu, one of the 25 districts of Seoul, South Korea
