= Chengbei Subdistrict, Huaihua =

Chengbei Subdistrict 城北街道
- Subdistrict
- Interactive map of Chengbei Subdistrict
- Coordinates: 27°34′02″N 109°57′41″E
- Country: People's Republic of China
- Province: Hunan
- Prefecture-level city: Huaihua
- District: Hecheng
- Village-level divisions: 7 residential communities
- Elevation: 243 m (797 ft)
- Time zone: UTC+8 (China Standard)
- Area code: 0745

Chengbei Subdistrict (Chinese: 城北街道; pinyin: Chéngběi Jiēdào; lit. 'city north') is a subdistrict of Hecheng District, in the north of Huaihua, Hunan, People's Republic of China. As of 2011, it has seven residential communities (居委会) under its administration.
