= Chengbei Subdistrict, Deyang =

Chengbei Subdistrict 城北街道
- Subdistrict
- Location in Sichuan
- Coordinates: 31°09′05″N 104°23′33″E
- Country: People's Republic of China
- Province: Sichuan
- Prefecture-level city: Deyang
- District: Jingyang
- Elevation: 503 m (1,650 ft)
- Time zone: UTC+8 (China Standard)

Chengbei Subdistrict (Chinese: 城北街道; pinyin: Chéngběi Jiēdào; lit. 'city north') is a subdistrict of Jingyang District, Deyang, Sichuan, People's Republic of China, occupying the northern portion of the district as its name suggests. As of 2011, it has 24 residential communities (社区) and 2 villages under its administration.

== See also ==
- List of township-level divisions of Sichuan
