= Linxia City =

Linxia 临夏市 لٍِ‌ثِيَا شِ
- County-level city
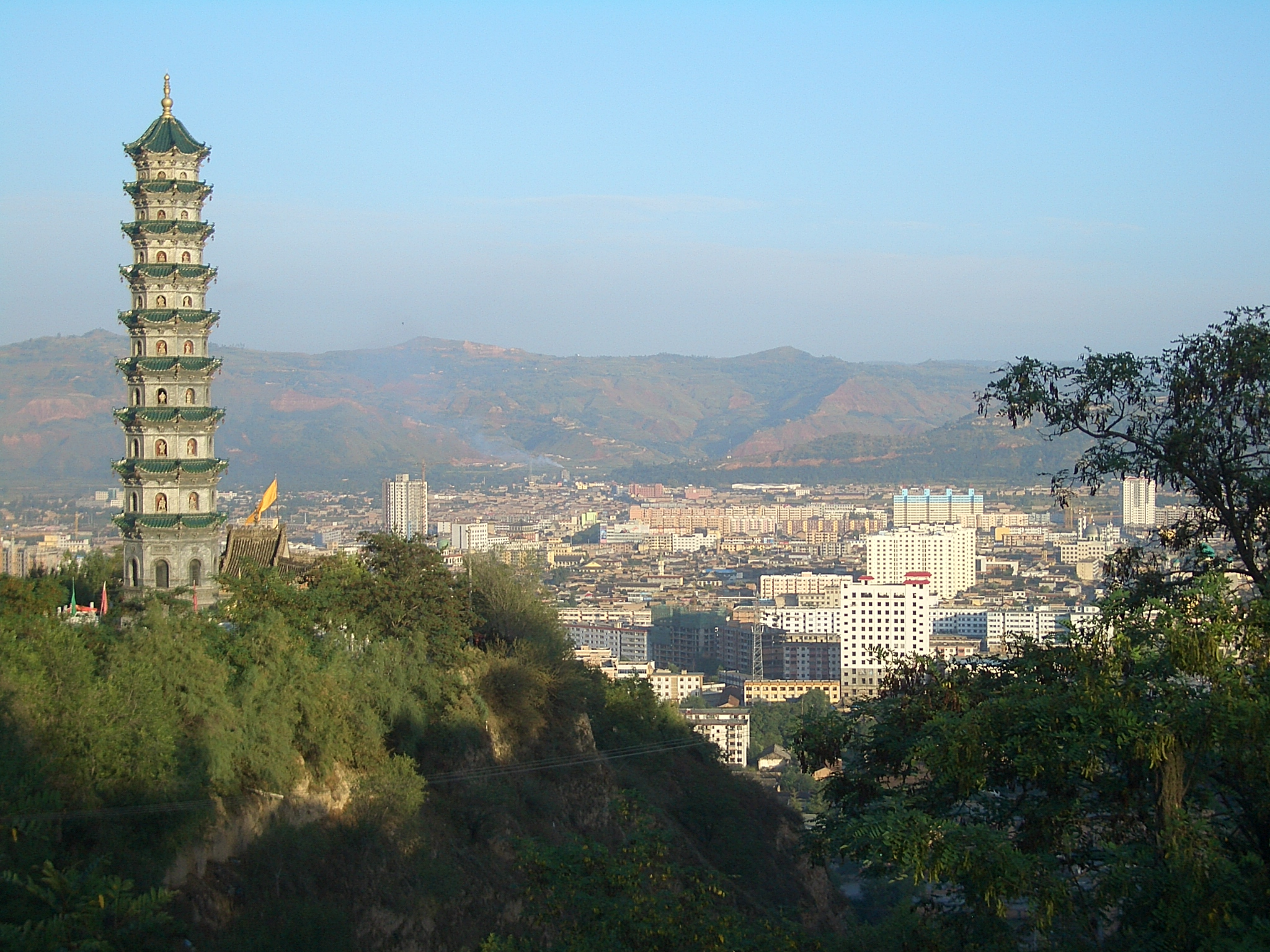
- A view of the city from the northern loess plateau escarpment depicting a Taoist Wanshou Guan temple

- Location in Gansu Location in China
- Coordinates (Linxia City government): 35°36′17″N 103°14′32″E
- Country: China
- Province: Gansu
- Autonomous prefecture: Linxia
- Municipal seat: Chengnan Subdistrict

Area
  - Total: 88.6 km^{2} (34.2 sq mi)
- Highest elevation: 1,960 m (6,430 ft)
- Lowest elevation: 1,823 m (5,981 ft)

Population (2020)
  - Total: 355,968
  - Density: 4,020/km^{2} (10,400/sq mi)
- Time zone: UTC+8 (China Standard)
- Postal code: 731100
- Website: www.lxs.gov.cn

Linxia City (simplified Chinese: 临夏市; traditional Chinese: 臨夏市; pinyin: Línxià Shì, Xiao'erjing: لٍِ‌ثِيَا شِ), once known as Hezhou (Chinese: 河州; pinyin: Hézhōu; Wade–Giles: Ho-chou, Xiao'erjing: حَ‌جِوْ), is a county-level city in the province of Gansu, China and the capital of the multi-ethnic Linxia Hui Autonomous Prefecture. It is located in the valley of the Daxia River (a right tributary of the Yellow River), 150 km (93 mi) (by road) southwest of the provincial capital Lanzhou.

The population of the entire county-level city of Linxia (which includes both the central city and some rural area) is estimated at 250,000; of which, 58.4% is classified as urban population. According to the prefectural government, 51.4% of Linxia City's population belongs to the "Hui nationality", i.e. the Chinese-speaking Muslims. Some members of Linxia Prefecture other minority ethnic groups, such as Bonan, Dongxiang and Salar, live in the city.

For centuries, Hezhou/Linxia has been one of the main religious, cultural and commercial centers of China's Muslim community, earning itself the nickname of "the little Mecca of China". In the words of the ethnologist Dru Gladney, "Almost every major Islamic movement in China finds its origin among Muslims who came to Linxia disseminating new doctrines after pilgrimage to Middle Eastern Islamic centers". It remains the main center of China's Qadiriyyah and Khufiyya Sufi orders; it was also the home of Ma Mingxin, the founder of the Jahriyya order, although that order's "center of gravity" has shifted elsewhere since.

== Geography ==
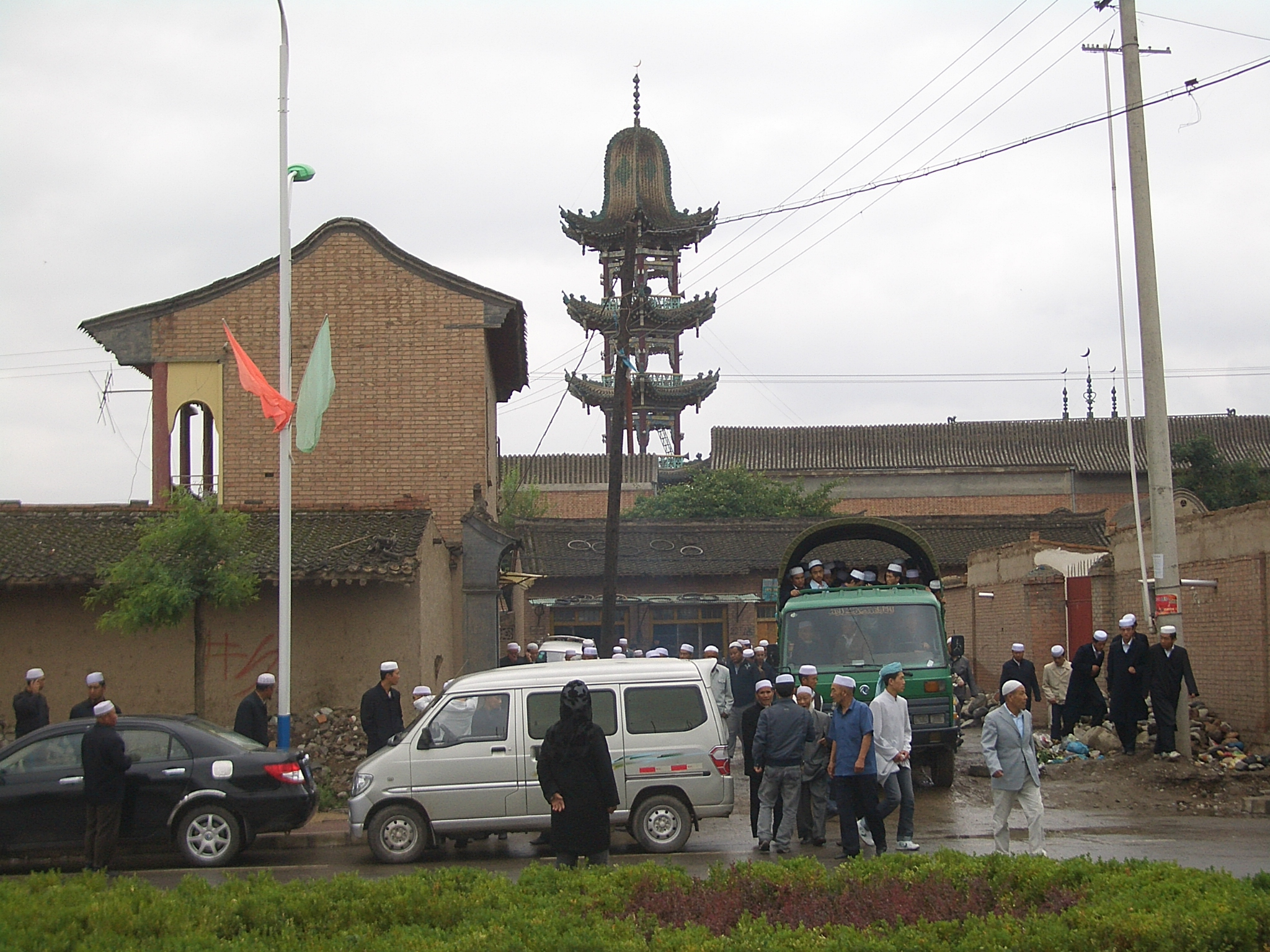
Worshippers leaving a small mosque in Linxia City, on foot, by truck and bus

Administratively, Linxia City is an incorporated county-level city. Unlike many Chinese county-level cities, which include a county-size expanse of the countryside, the boundaries of Linxia City include only a fairly small area (88.6 km^{2}), stretched along the Daxia River, which in this region flows towards the northeast. The wide fertile valley of the river is flanked by Loess Plateau escarpments on both sides, and the countryside beyond these limits, to the northwest and southeast of the valley, belongs to a separate administrative unit, called Linxia County. Linxia City borders on Linxia County in the southwest as well, but in the northeast it has a short border with Dongxiang Autonomous County.

The main urban area of Linxia City (i.e., the city proper) is located roughly in the center of the city's administrative boundaries, on the left (northwestern) bank of the Daxia River. Administratively, the County-level City of Linxia is divided into 10 township-level units: 6 jiedao within the main urban area, and four towns (formerly, townships) in the adjacent rural and semi-rural areas upstream and downstream of the central city and across the river from it.

The central business district of Linxia City, corresponding to the former walled city of Hezhou, is located a couple of kilometers to the north of the Daxia River, and contains the city's more upscale shopping and entertainment precincts, as well as the prefectural government. The old city wall is gone, but its existence is remembered in many place names: Xi Guan Lu ("West Gate Street"), Chengjiao ([SW] "Corner of the City Wall") Mosque, Nanmen Guangchang ("South Gate Square") with Nanguan ("South Gate") Mosque, Dongguan ("East Gate") neighborhood, Bei Chengjiao Gongbei ("The Gongbei at the Northern Corner of the City Wall", a.k.a. Yu Baba Gongbei). A small river, called Hongshui He, flows along what must have been the southern part of the city wall. The main street within this central area is Tuanjie Lu ("Unity Street"), running north–south.

The area between the former south gate (Nanguan) and to the Daxia River is primarily commercial, with vibrant markets taking up much of the street space on market days. Beyond Nanguan, Tuanjie Lu becomes Jiefang Lu ("Liberation St"), and, after reaching the river, it continues south as Provincial Highway 309.

Many of the city's mosques and gongbei shrines are located in the historically Muslim district to the west and southwest of the city center. Hongyuan Square, with Hongyuan Park, the Prefecture Museum, and a sports complex are in this area as well.

The northeast of this city is mostly a modern multi-story residential area. Campuses of a number of educational institutions as well as the local garrison compound are located there.

A major landmark of Linxia City is the Taoist temple, Wanshou Guan. Its pagoda is perched on top of the loess plateau bluff that forms the natural northern limit for the city expansion. Great views of the city open from the bluff, and the pagoda can be seen from everywhere in the city as well.

== Climate ==
Linxia City has a humid continental climate (Köppen Dwb), typical for eastern Gansu. Summers are warm to very warm and humid, whilst winters are freezing but almost snowless due to the dominance of the Siberian High.

Climate data for Linxia City, elevation 1,917 m (6,289 ft), (1991–2020 normals, extremes 1981–2010)
Month	Jan	Feb	Mar	Apr	May	Jun	Jul	Aug	Sep	Oct	Nov	Dec	Year
Record high °C (°F)	14.8 (58.6)	19.4 (66.9)	27.7 (81.9)	30.8 (87.4)	30.5 (86.9)	32.7 (90.9)	36.4 (97.5)	34.7 (94.5)	30.5 (86.9)	25.8 (78.4)	20.3 (68.5)	14.9 (58.8)	36.4 (97.5)
Mean daily maximum °C (°F)	1.8 (35.2)	5.6 (42.1)	11.4 (52.5)	17.6 (63.7)	21.2 (70.2)	24.4 (75.9)	26.3 (79.3)	25.1 (77.2)	20.2 (68.4)	14.8 (58.6)	9.0 (48.2)	3.3 (37.9)	15.1 (59.1)
Daily mean °C (°F)	−6.0 (21.2)	−2.0 (28.4)	3.9 (39.0)	9.9 (49.8)	13.9 (57.0)	17.3 (63.1)	19.0 (66.2)	18.1 (64.6)	13.7 (56.7)	7.8 (46.0)	1.3 (34.3)	−4.6 (23.7)	7.7 (45.8)
Mean daily minimum °C (°F)	−11.6 (11.1)	−7.6 (18.3)	−1.7 (28.9)	3.5 (38.3)	7.6 (45.7)	11.1 (52.0)	13.1 (55.6)	12.8 (55.0)	9.2 (48.6)	3.1 (37.6)	−3.8 (25.2)	−9.9 (14.2)	2.2 (35.9)
Record low °C (°F)	−22.8 (−9.0)	−21.0 (−5.8)	−16.0 (3.2)	−6.3 (20.7)	−2.1 (28.2)	2.8 (37.0)	4.9 (40.8)	5.3 (41.5)	0.1 (32.2)	−10.5 (13.1)	−16.6 (2.1)	−24.7 (−12.5)	−24.7 (−12.5)
Average precipitation mm (inches)	3.7 (0.15)	5.7 (0.22)	14.7 (0.58)	32.4 (1.28)	60.8 (2.39)	62.5 (2.46)	104.9 (4.13)	115.5 (4.55)	74.2 (2.92)	35.9 (1.41)	6.4 (0.25)	1.9 (0.07)	518.6 (20.41)
Average precipitation days (≥ 0.1 mm)	4.1	5.0	7.2	8.4	11.9	13.4	14.4	13.6	14.2	9.8	3.9	2.8	108.7
Average snowy days	7.4	7.3	7.8	2.6	0.2	0	0	0	0	1.6	4.6	4.8	36.3
Average relative humidity (%)	59	57	56	54	60	66	72	76	80	77	69	63	66
Mean monthly sunshine hours	167.8	172.2	196.5	217.7	227.4	224.5	225.7	208.5	154.1	165.9	176.8	176.1	2,313.2
Percentage possible sunshine	54	56	53	55	52	52	51	51	42	48	58	58	53
Source: China Meteorological Administration

== History ==
In the past, Linxia City was called Hezhou (河州), and the surrounding area was sometimes known as Hezhou Prefecture.

Throughout its history, Hezhou often was the crossing of important trade routes: one of the alternative paths of the east-way Silk Route, connecting China's heartland with Central Asia, and the north–south route linking Mongolia and Tibet. During parts of the Song dynasty period, when the Western Xia took control of the more northerly path of the Silk Route, the more southerly Didao-Hezhou-Xining alternative path of the Silk Route may have become particularly important, making all three cities important commercial centers. Historians think that it was then, during the Song dynasty, that the Muslims of Hezhou probably built their first mosque.

=== The Sufi orders ===
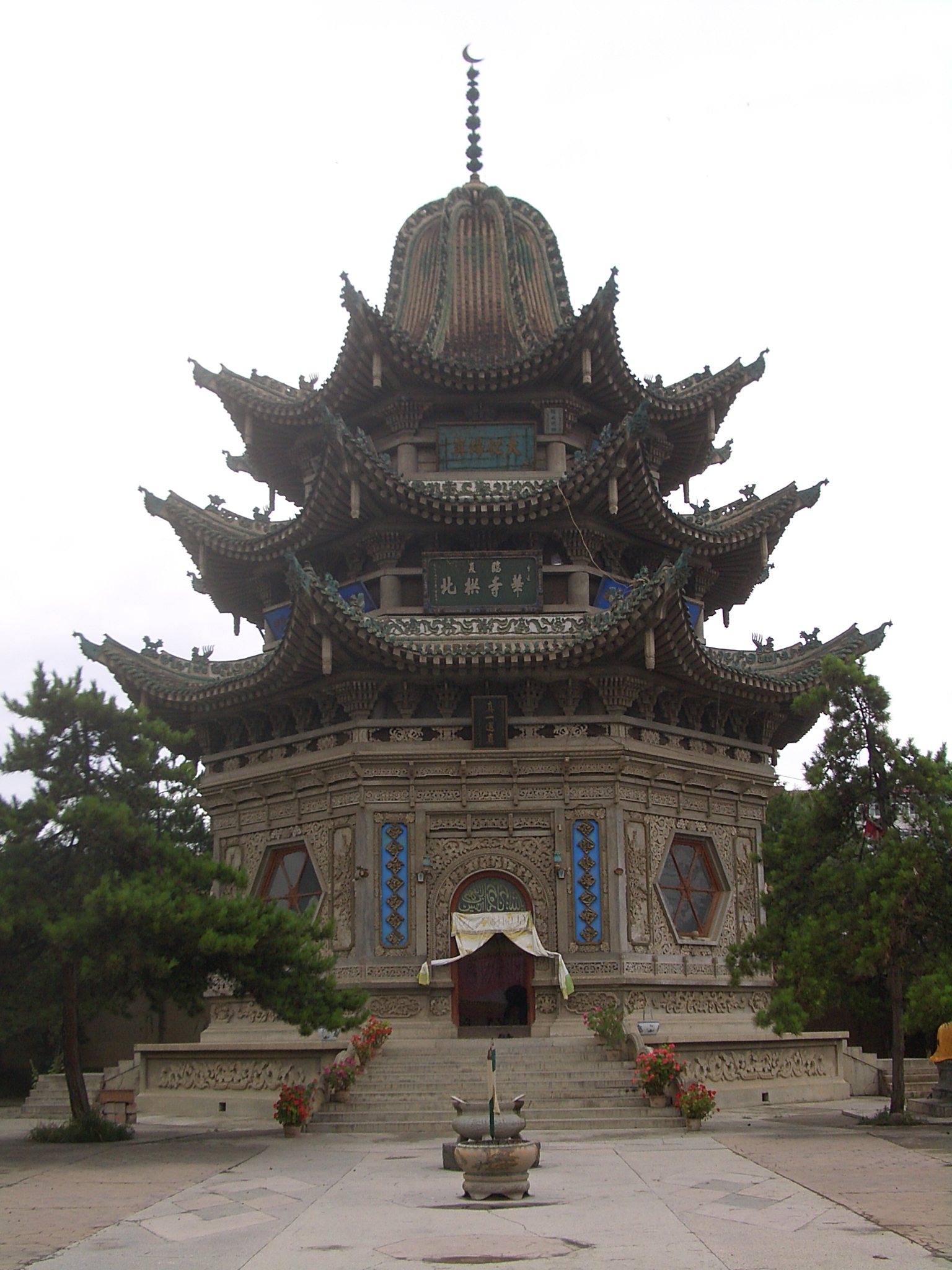
Hua Si Gongbei (Ma Laichi's mausoleum)

Hezhou was already an important Islamic center in the 1670s, when the Kashgarian Sufi master Āfāq Khoja made his tour of the Muslim communities of Qing Empire's northwestern borderlands. While his preaching in Xining, Didao and Lanzhou is better documented, he most likely preached in Hezhou as well. In any event, both Āfāq Khoja's Chinese disciple Ma Tai Baba and another Chinese Sufi master, Qi Jingyi-the founder of the Chinese branch of the Qadiriyyah school-were buried in Hezhou. The gongbei shrines around their tombs on Linxia City's west side continue to be important centers of Islamic scholarship.

However, it was a Hezhou native and Tai Baba's most promising student, Ma Laichi who revolutionized the life of northwestern China's Muslims in the mid-18th century by making Hezhou the center of the Hua Si menhuan, the main organization of the Khufiyya Sufi movement. Soon enough, many people from the Hui and Salar communities were embroiled in conflicts between the followers of Ma Laichi's Khufiyya and those of another Sufi order - the Jahriyya, founded in the 1760s by Ma Mingxin. The conflict came to a head in 1781 when Salar land in Xunhua County a few score kilometers to the west of the city was briefly besieged by the Salar rebels who passed by on the way to Lanzhou, in an unsuccessful bid to save the imprisoned Ma Mingxin.

=== The Muslim Minorities Rebellion and War ===
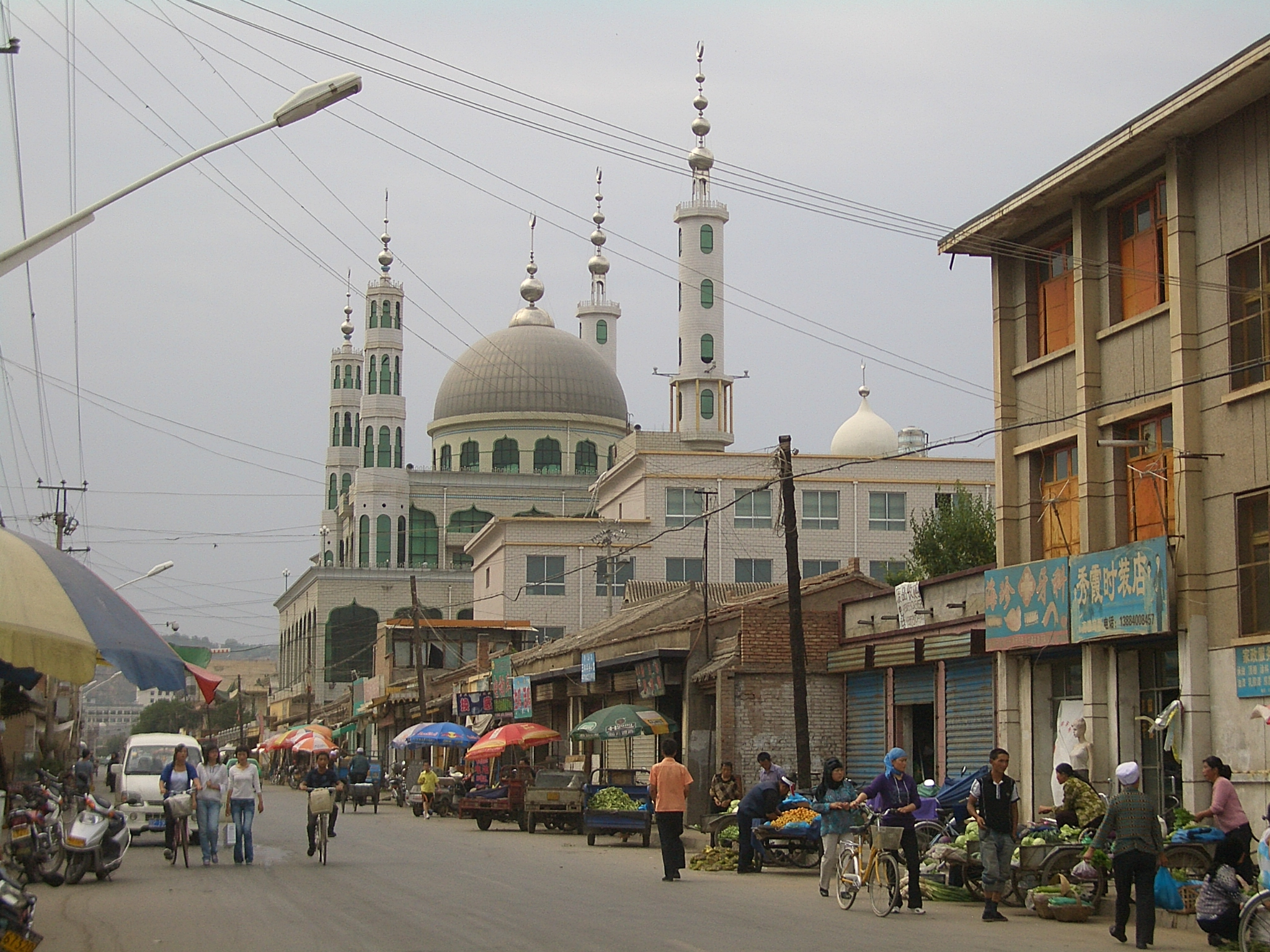
Qianheyan Mosque, Linxia City

Soon after the beginning of the Massive Muslim Armed Rebellion in Northwestern China in 1862, Hezhou became one of the main strongholds of the Muslim rebels who fought against the Qing dynasty and killed many non-Muslim Han and Manchu people in Northwestern China. The leader of the rebellion in the Hezhou region was Ma Zhan'ao, the leader of the Hezhou-based Huasi menhuan, a Khufiyya Sufi order founded over a century before by Ma Laichi. His top lieutenants were Ma Haiyan and Ma Qianling. A pragmatic leader, Ma Zhan'ao apparently preferred to avoid unnecessary bloodshed; soon after seizing the city, he made an effort to enable the Qing officials to flee the rebel city with whatever assets they could carry.

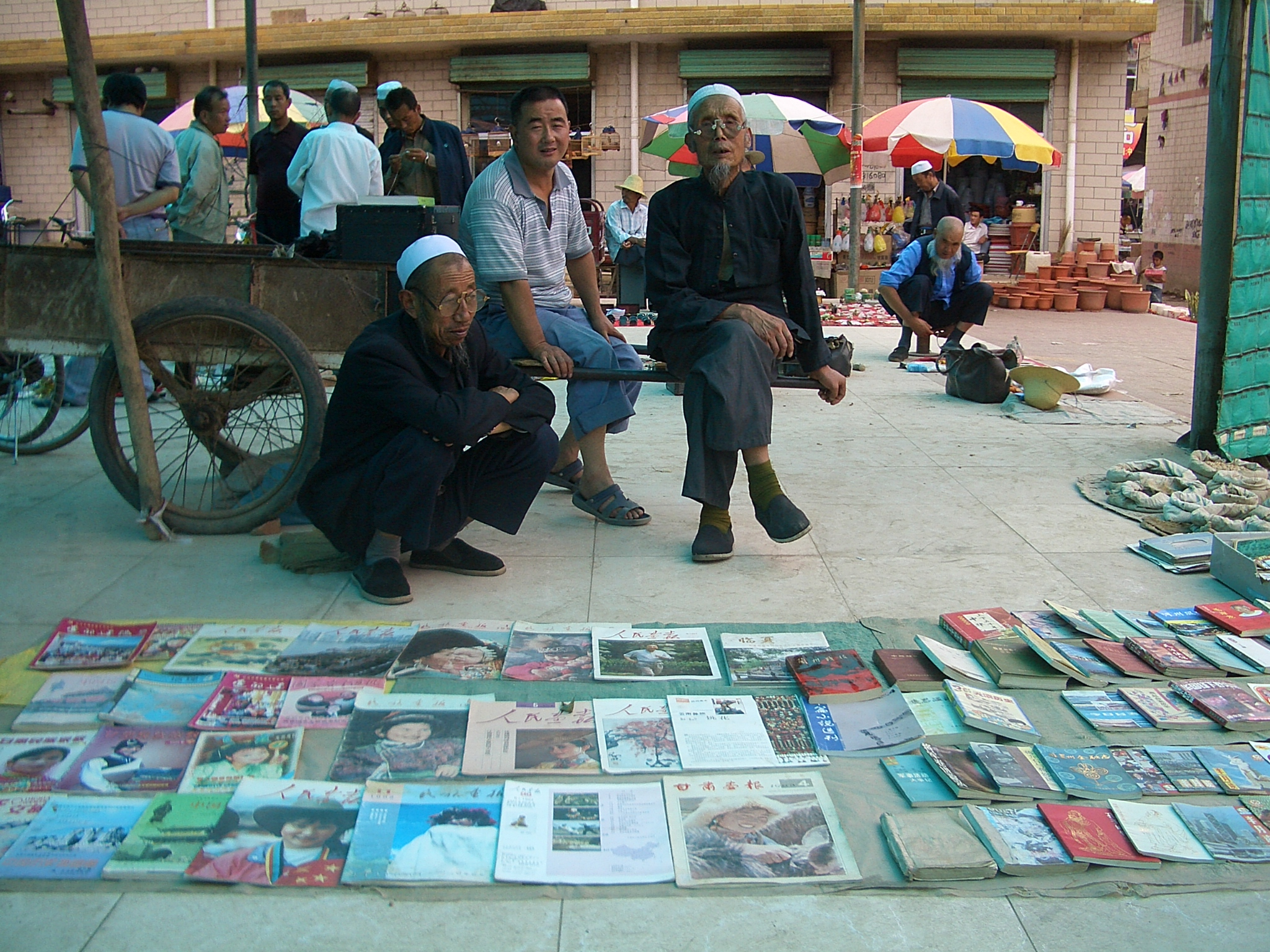
Two Hui book vendors at a Linxia City market, wearing traditional eyeglasses

By late 1872, Qing armies led by general Zuo Zongtang had destroyed the Hui rebels in the regions to the east of Hezhou (Shaanxi and Ningxia), and reached the Tao River, separating today's Linxia Prefecture from its eastern neighbor, Dingxi. Zuo's attempts to gain a foothold west of the Tao River were stymied by Ma Zhan'ao's Muslim fighters. But Ma realized that he could not hold against the Qing armies forever, and in early 1873 he sent his son, who was soon to become known as Ma Anliang, to Zuo's headquarters in Anding to negotiate switching sides. Pursuant to the agreement, Ma Zhan'ao surrendered Hezhou to the government forces, executed those locals who objected to the surrender, and joined the government side himself, to fight against the rebels farther west. In exchange, Zuo Zongtang treated the Hezhou Muslim community much better than he had the people of Ma Hualong's Jinjipu, or than he would treat the defenders of Suzhou later this year. The Hezhou Muslims were spared a massacre or a relocation to a remote region; instead, in a unique gesture during that war, Zuo acted to reduce the inter-communal tension by relocating some of the local non-Muslim Han people away from the Muslims. Nonetheless, in order to ensure the government's control over the region, the Muslims were prohibited to live within the city walls of Hezhou. For many decades thereafter, the walled city remained the non-Muslim Han territory, with its mosques converted to Buddhist temples, while the Hui Muslims lived and built their mosques outside of the city walls, in particular in the southern suburb of Bafang.

Ma Zhan'ao himself went to fight along with Zuo Zongtang against the Muslim rebels farther west. For his efforts (and on Zuo's request), Ma was later rewarded by the "feathered cap of the fifth rank" (花翎五品顶戴); his and his lieutenants' descendants went to play an important role in the region's history for decades to come.

"The south and "Small" west suburbs (the only ones) are almost entirely populated by Muslims. In the suburbs business flourishes to a far greater extent than within the city walls. Muslim merchants there have merchandise from all parts of China for sale. In the suburbs it is exceptional to meet many Chinese, and trade of all kinds is mostly in Muslim hands. There are Muslim officials the principal being the relatives of the late Ma An-liang, and a certain La "Ta ren" who is a "Chu-ren." There are quite a number of Muslims who are able to read Chinese and a school to teach the government curriculum has been opened in the suburb." "It is impossible at the present juncture to make any full statement regarding the religious conditions prevailing in this district. There are the New, Old, and "New New" sects; four great men-huan and numerous small ones. Since the death of Ma An-liang in November, 1918, there have been considerable disagreements between Old and New Sects, "New New" being anathema to both. A proclamation put out by the Tuchun of Kansu has forbidden further dispute, but what the future holds without a Ma An-liang remains to be seen."

Ma Anliang was regarded by westerners as the leader of Muslims in Gansu. Ma Anliang's son held the title of garrison commissioner in Hezhou (Linxia) in 1922.

== The mosques and mausoleums of Linxia City ==
Linxia City has over 80 mosques, built in a variety of architectural styles. There are also a number of gongbei shrines centered on graves of Sufi masters.

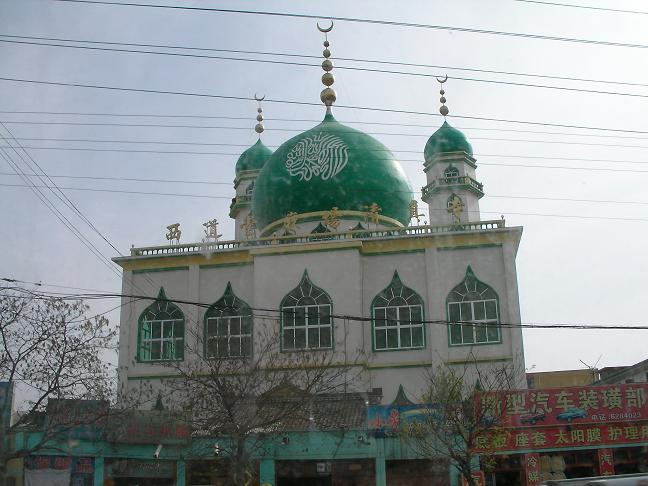
Machang Mosque, of the Xidaotang organization

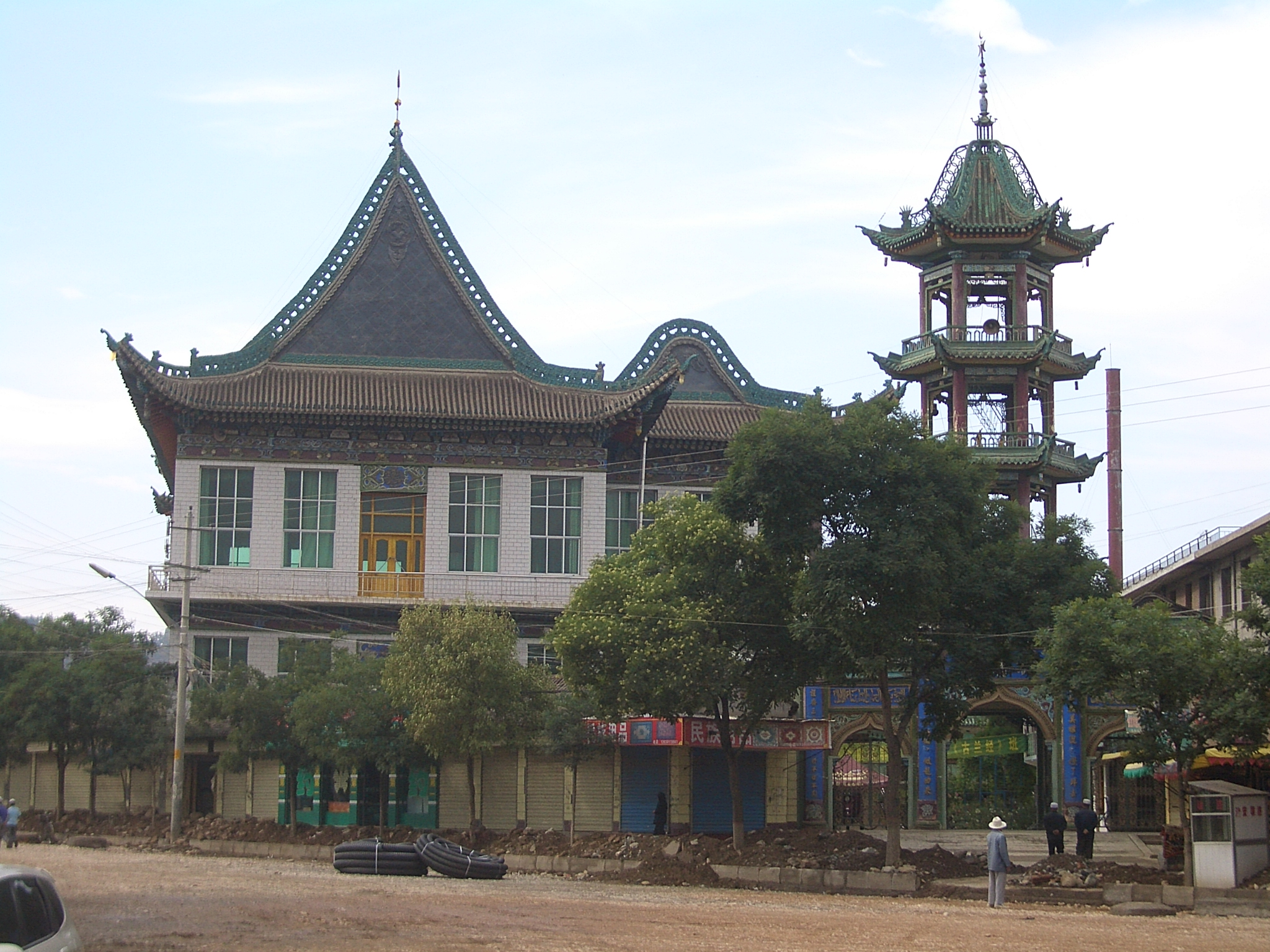
Chengjiao Mosque

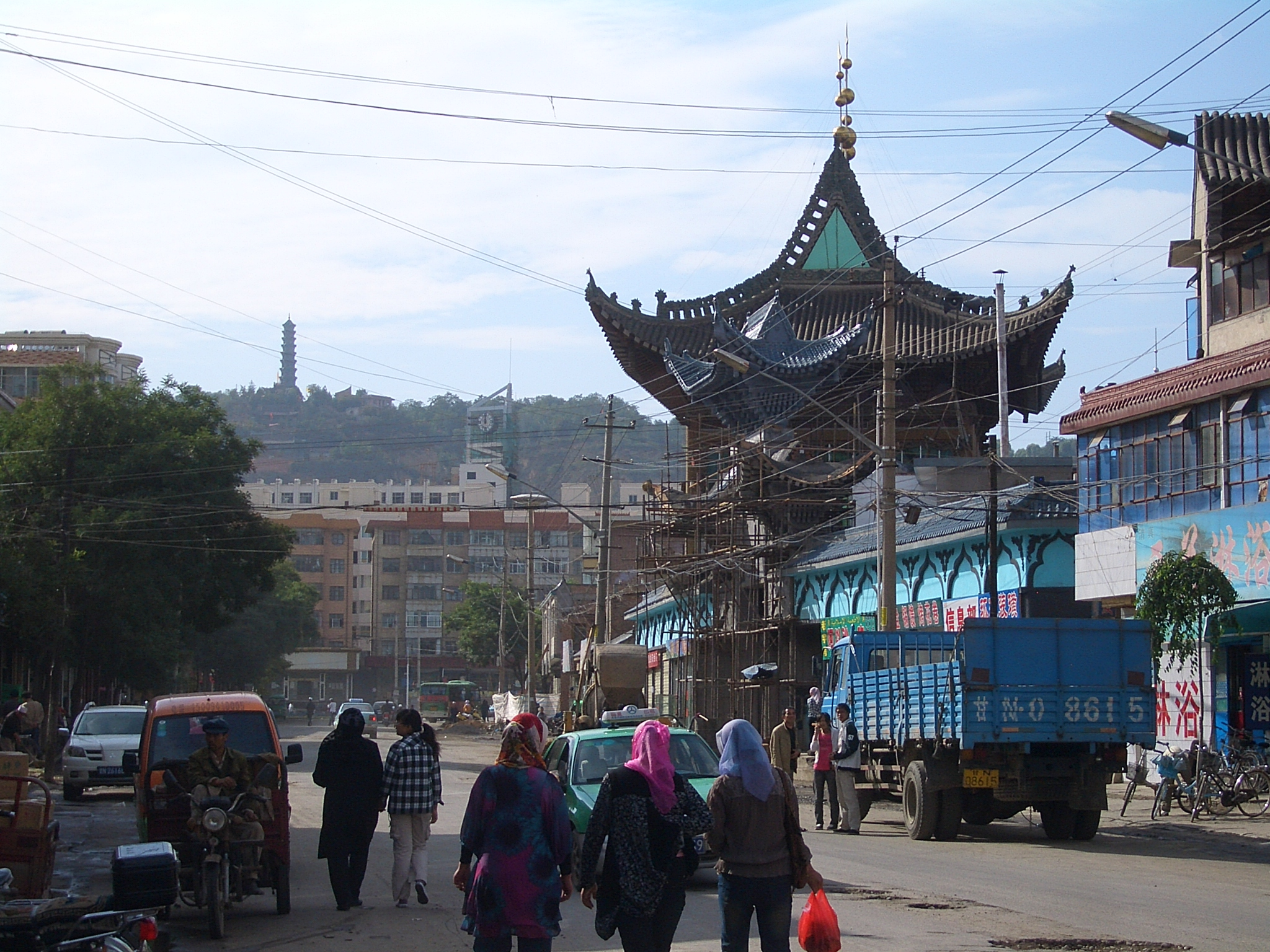
Suoma Mosque

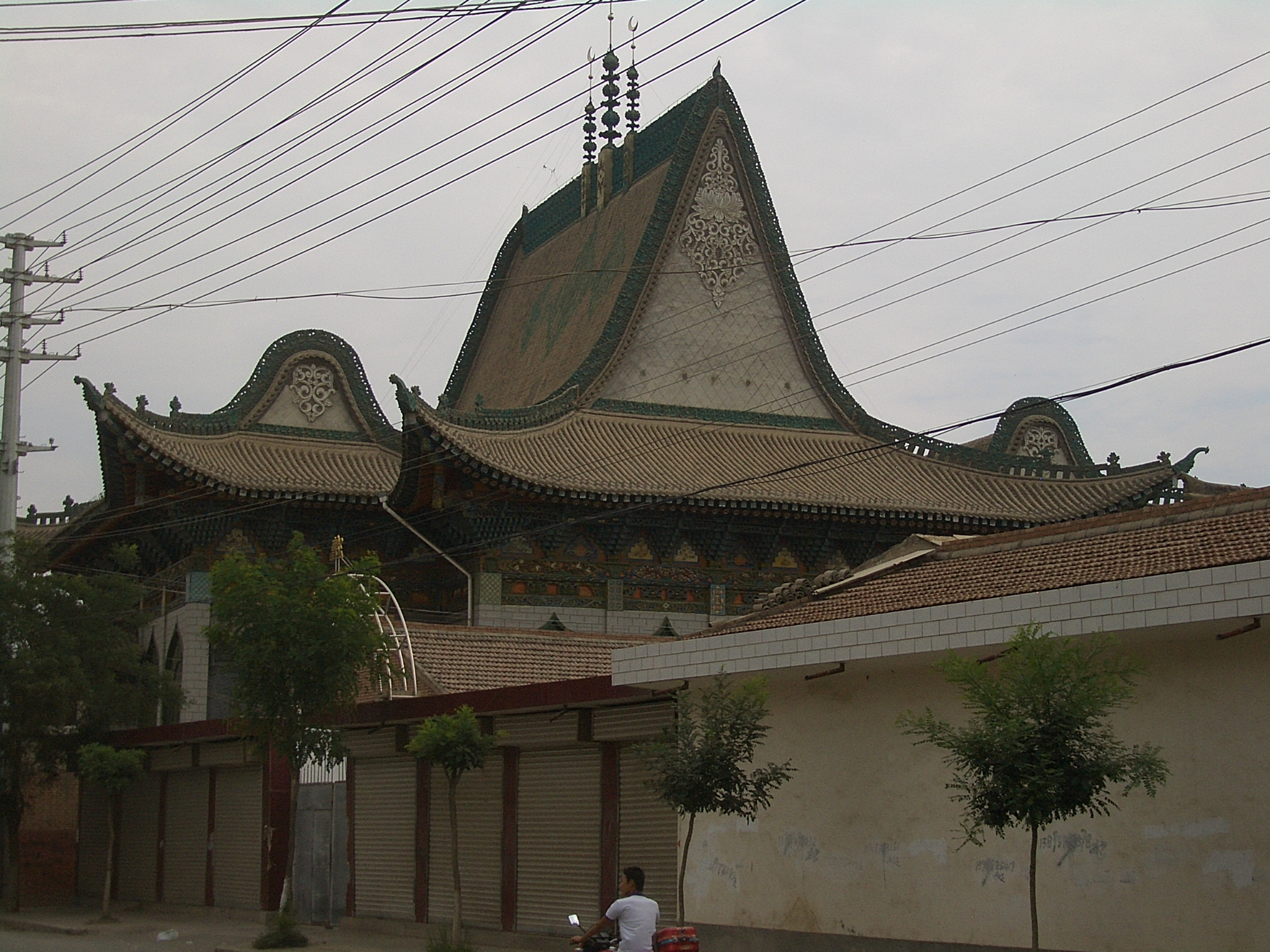
Dongguan Mosque

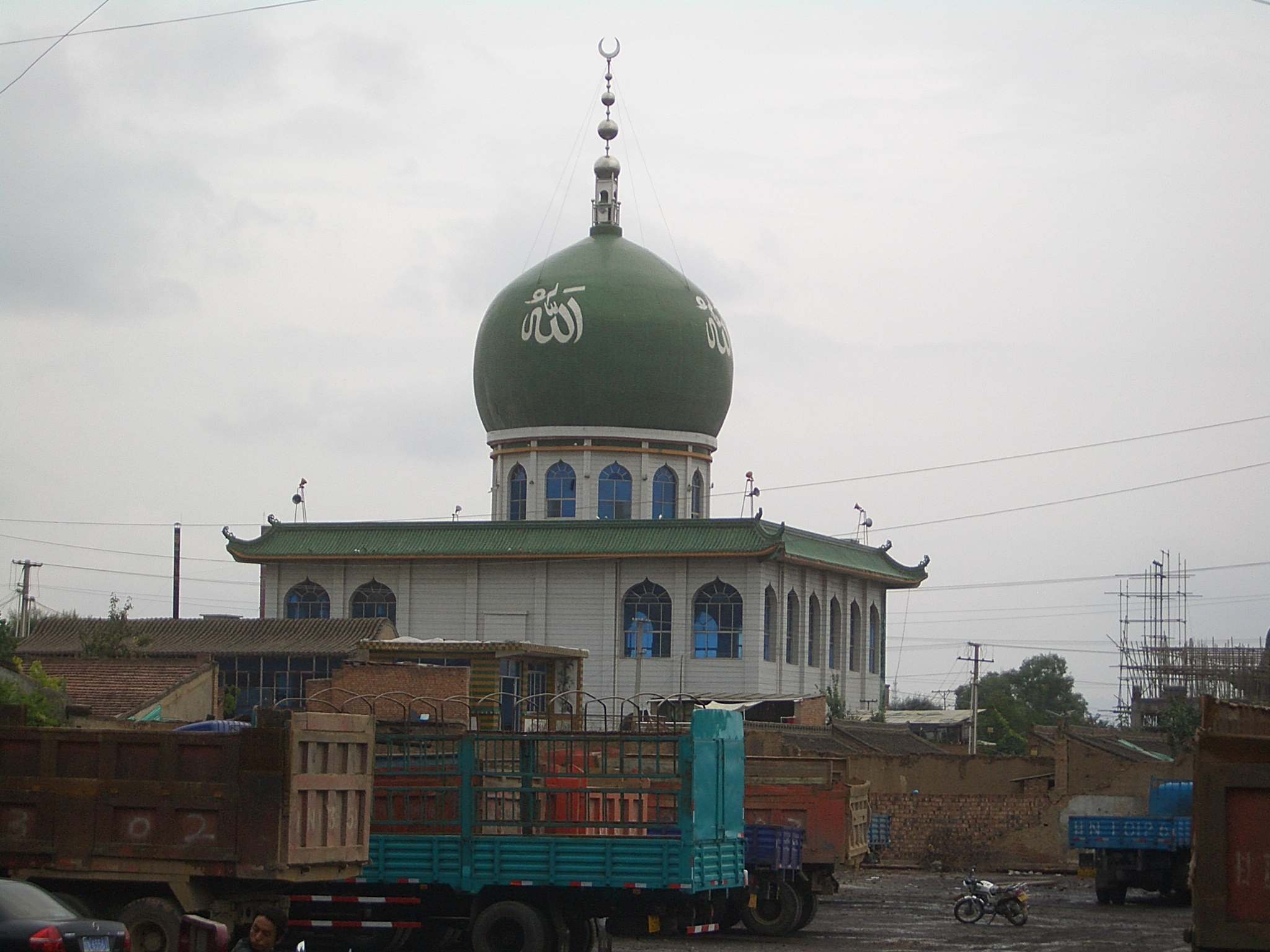
A mosque in Huancheng Xi Lu

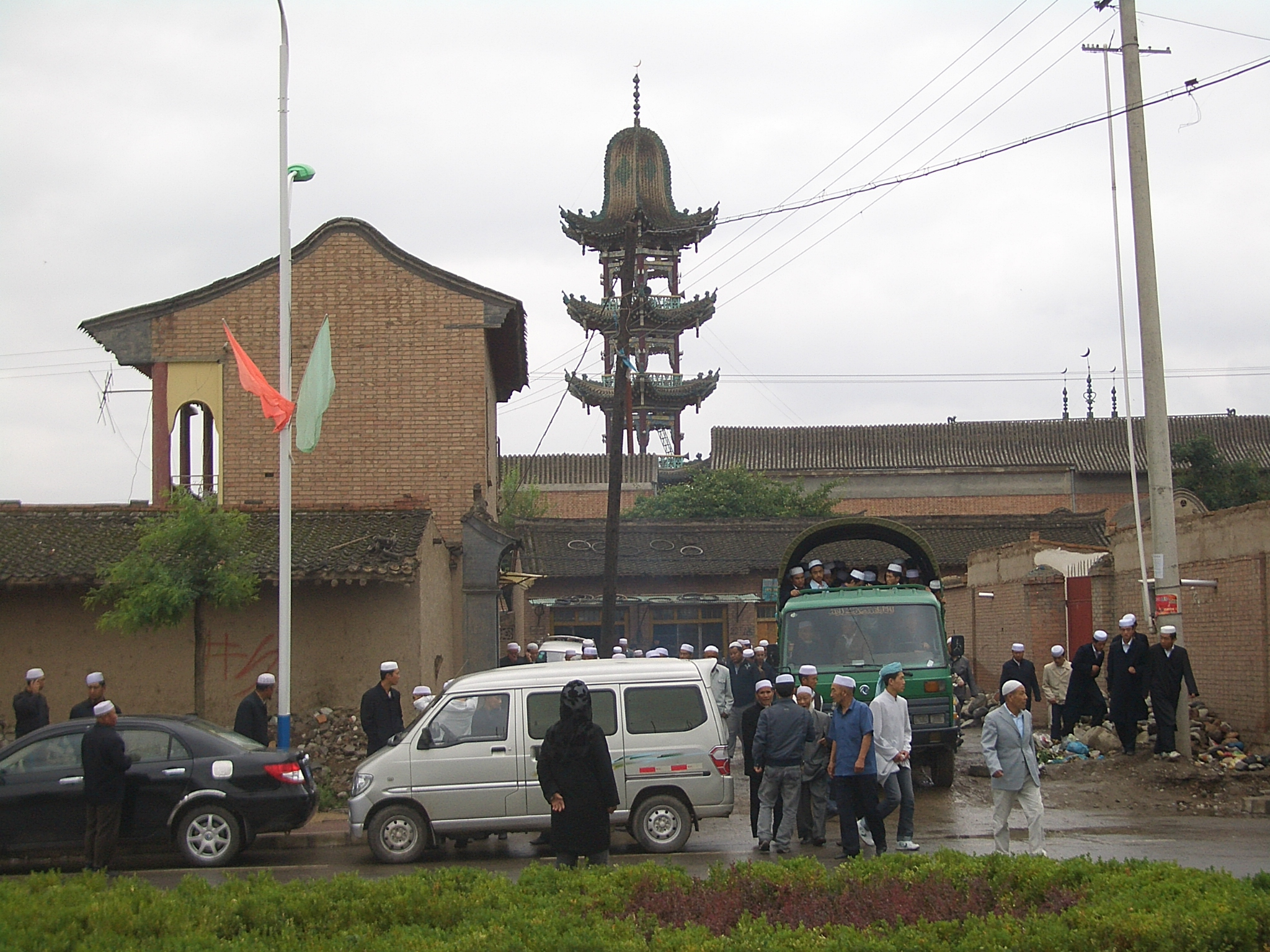
SW of Xin Xi Lu

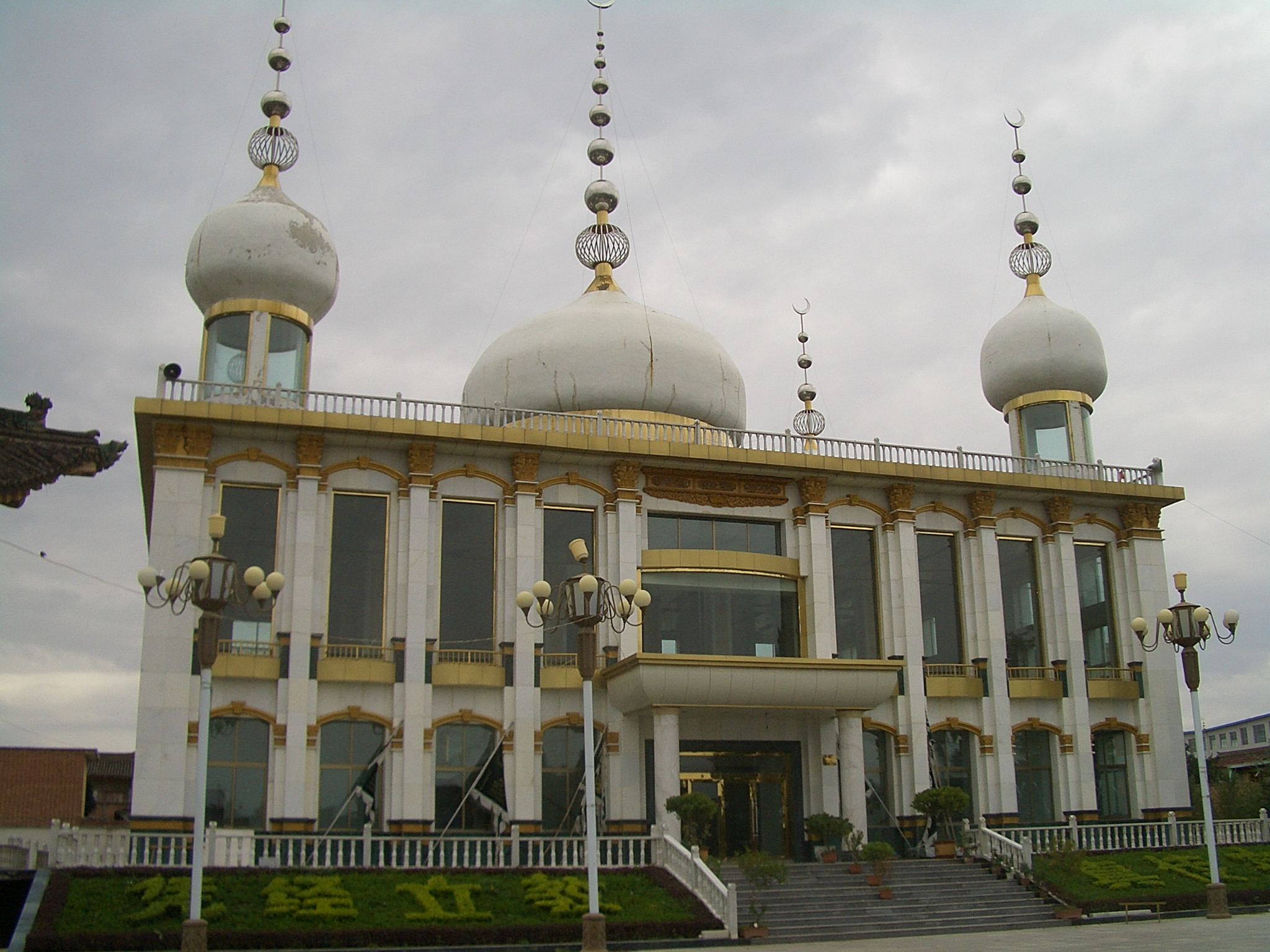
Multicolored Mosque

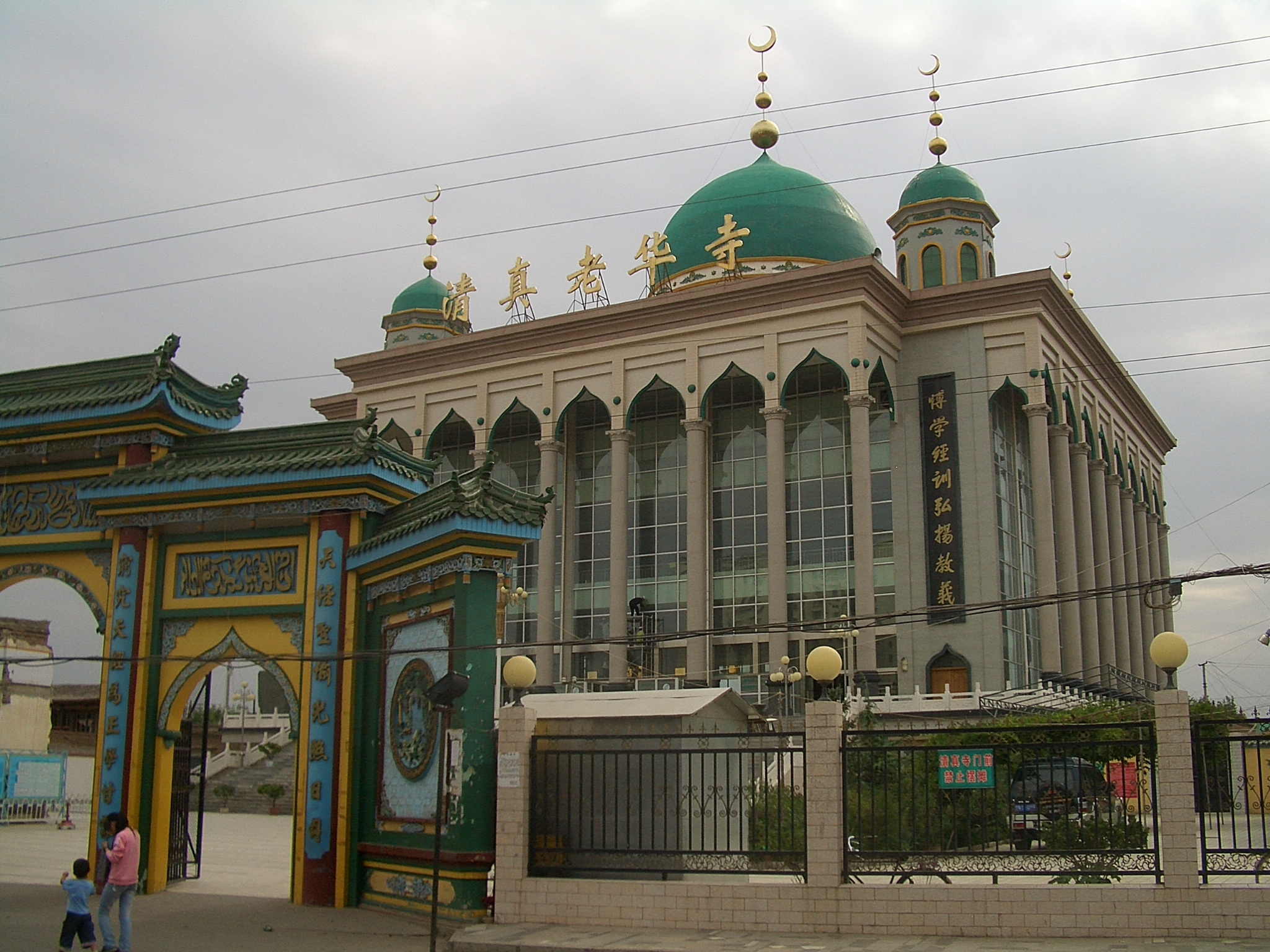
Laohua Mosque

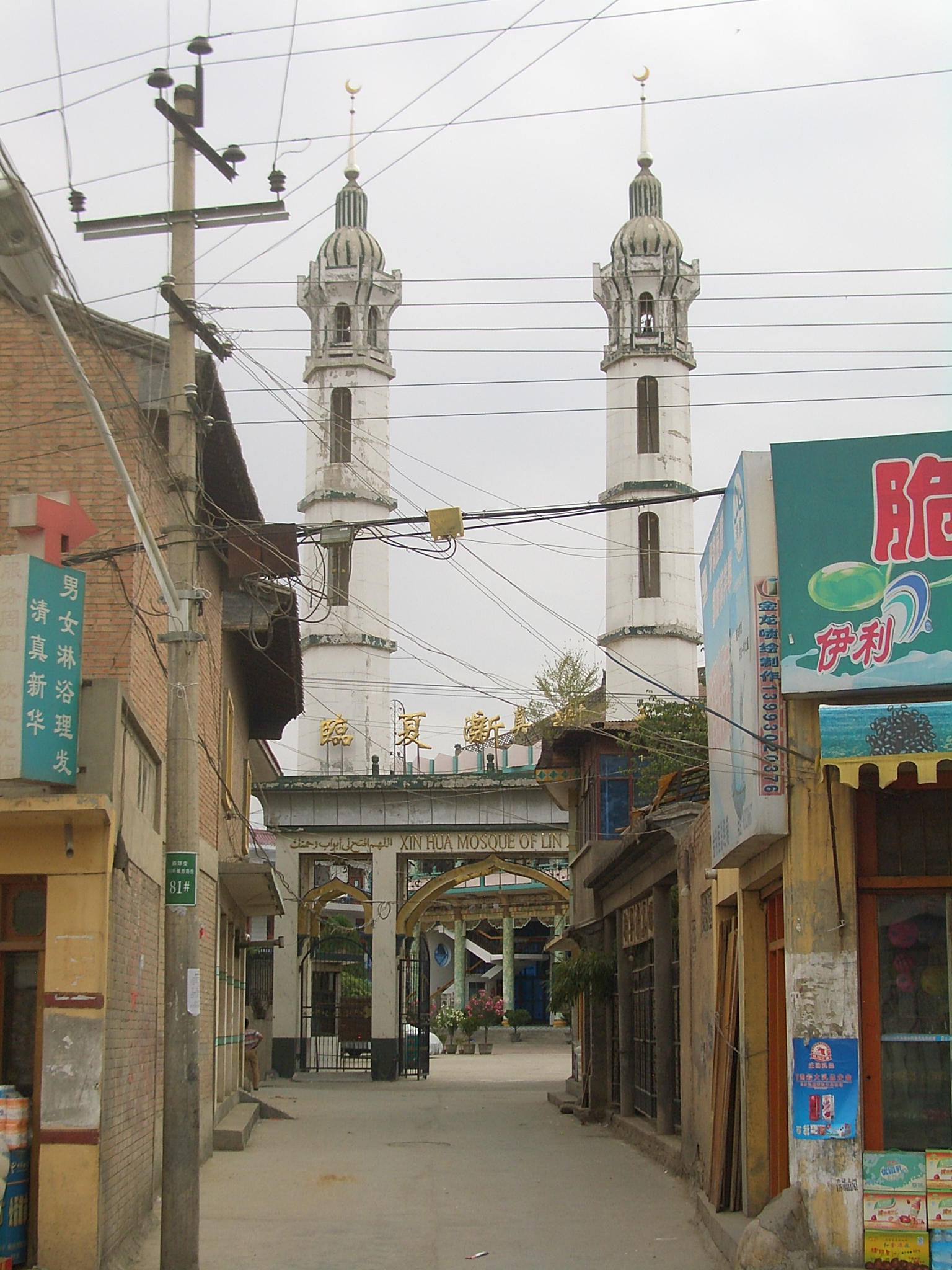
Xinhua Mosque

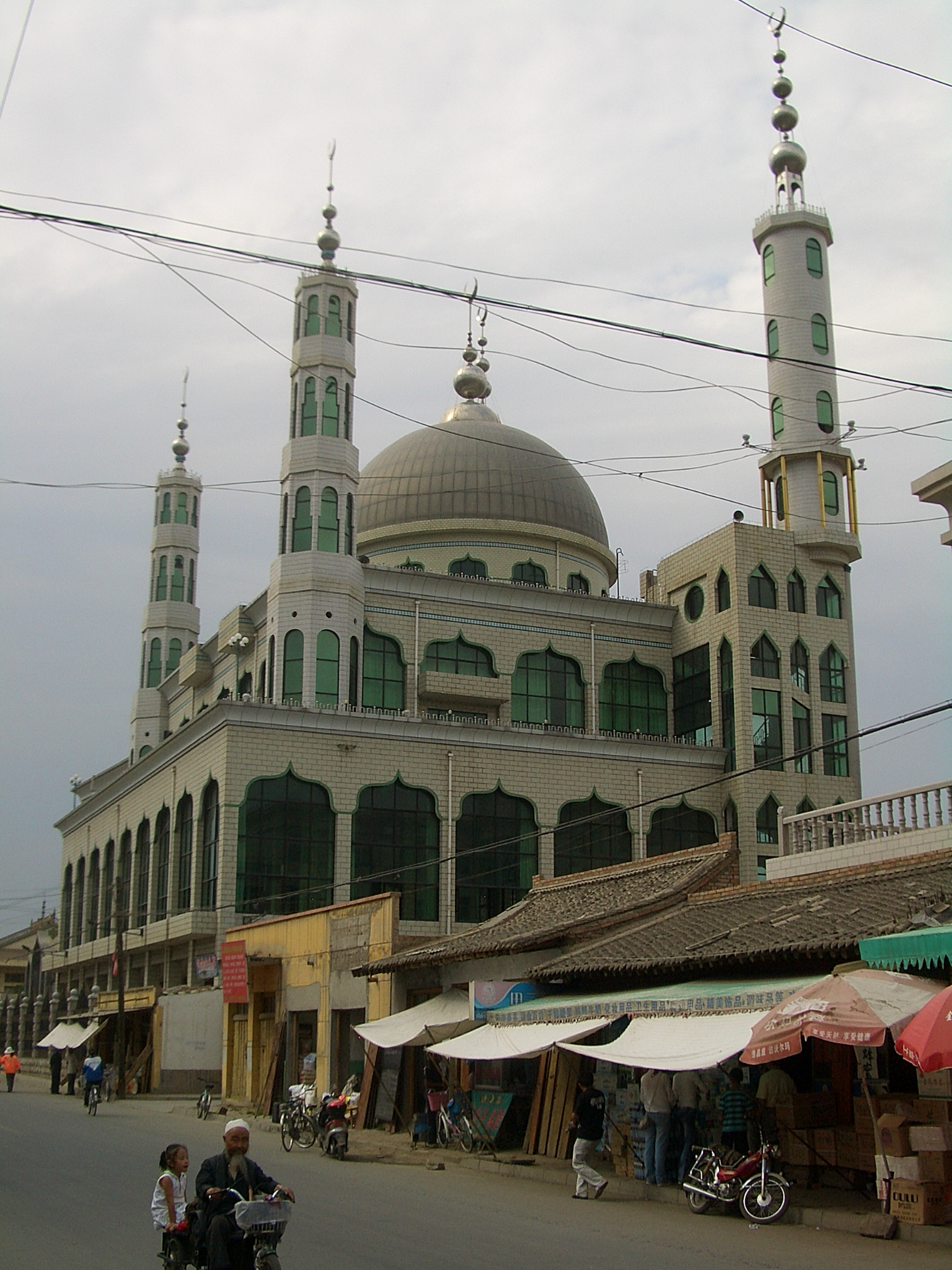
Qianheyan Mosque

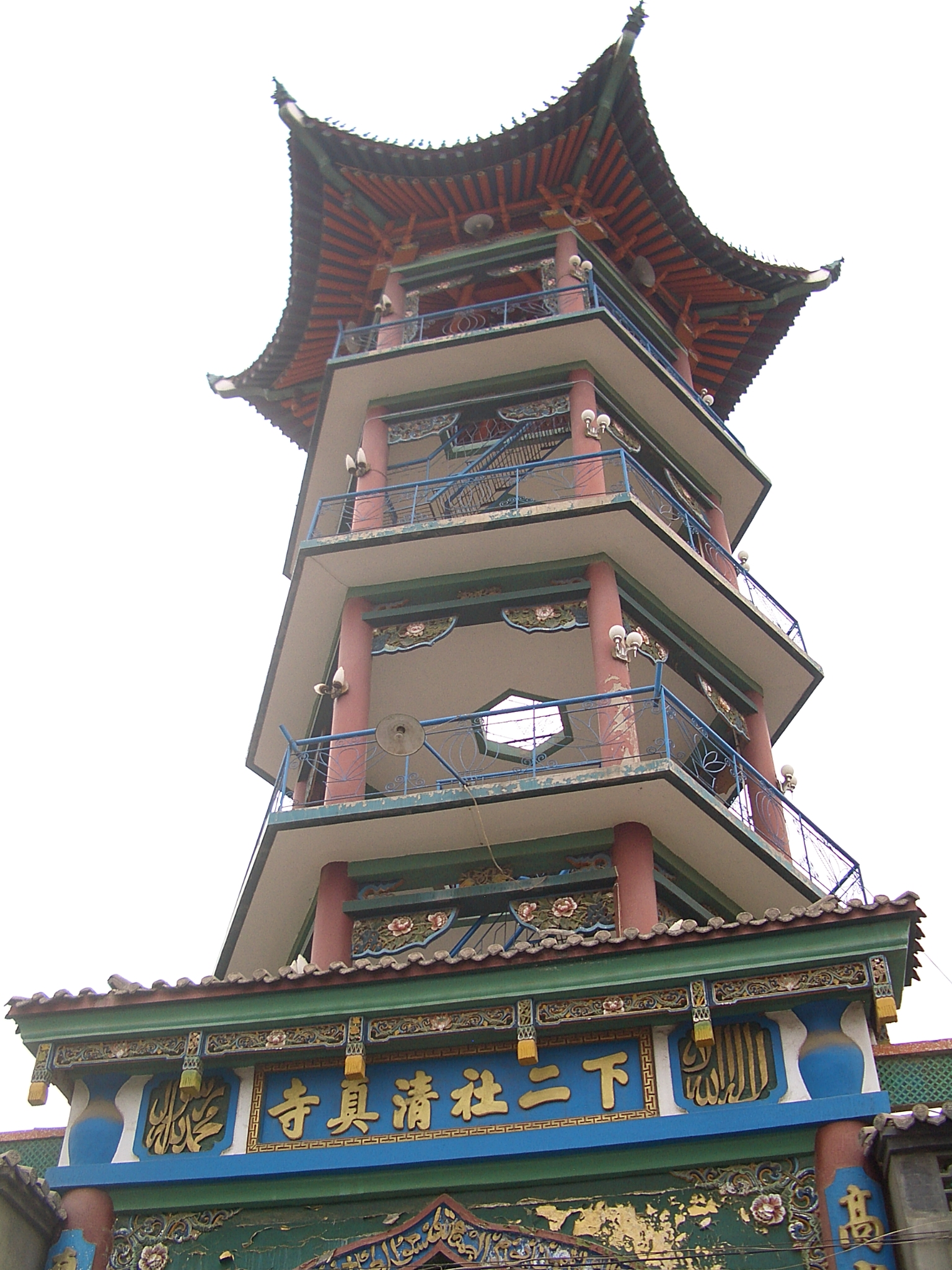
Xia Ershe Mosque, with a pagoda-style minaret

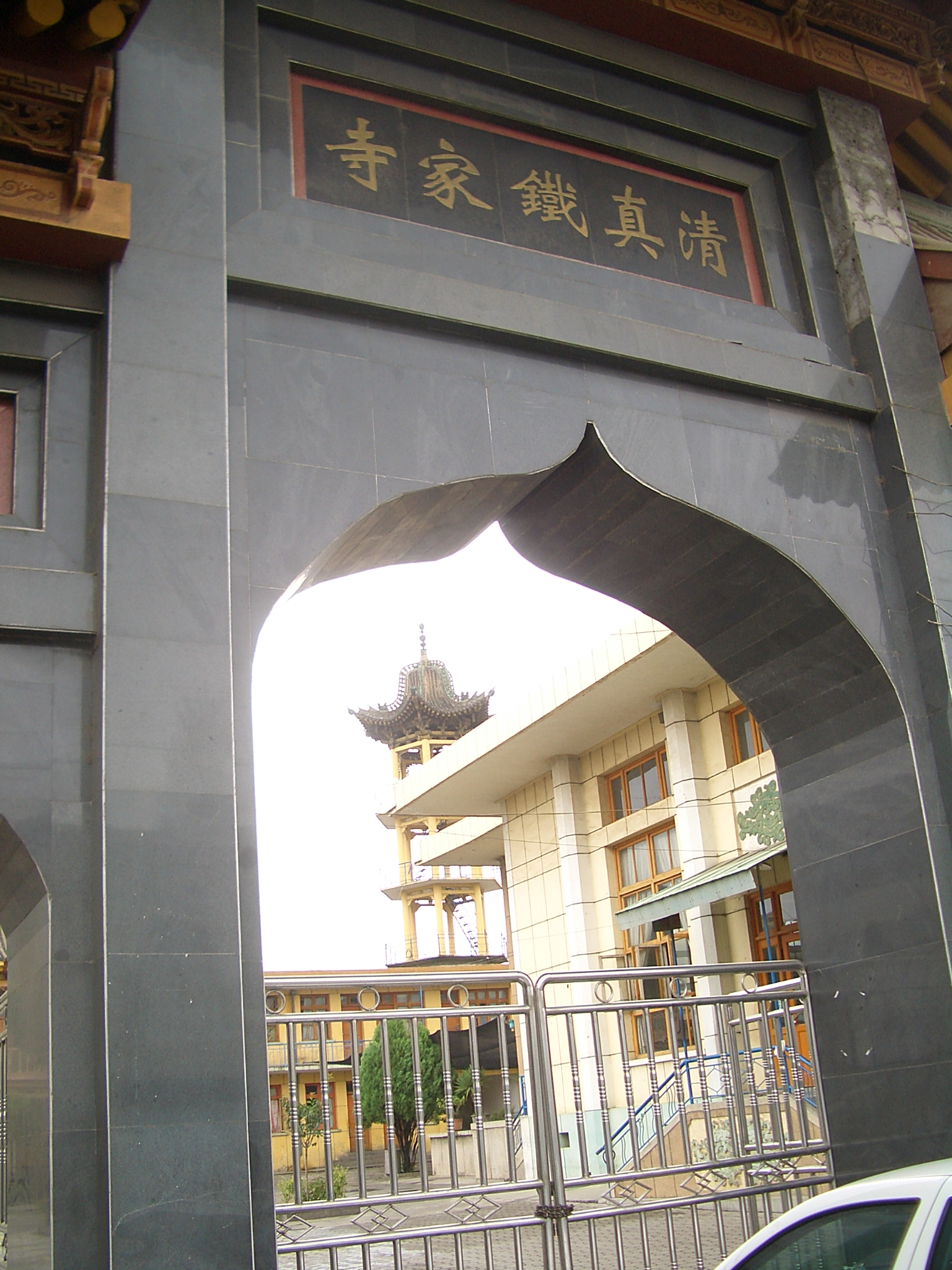
Tiejia Mosque

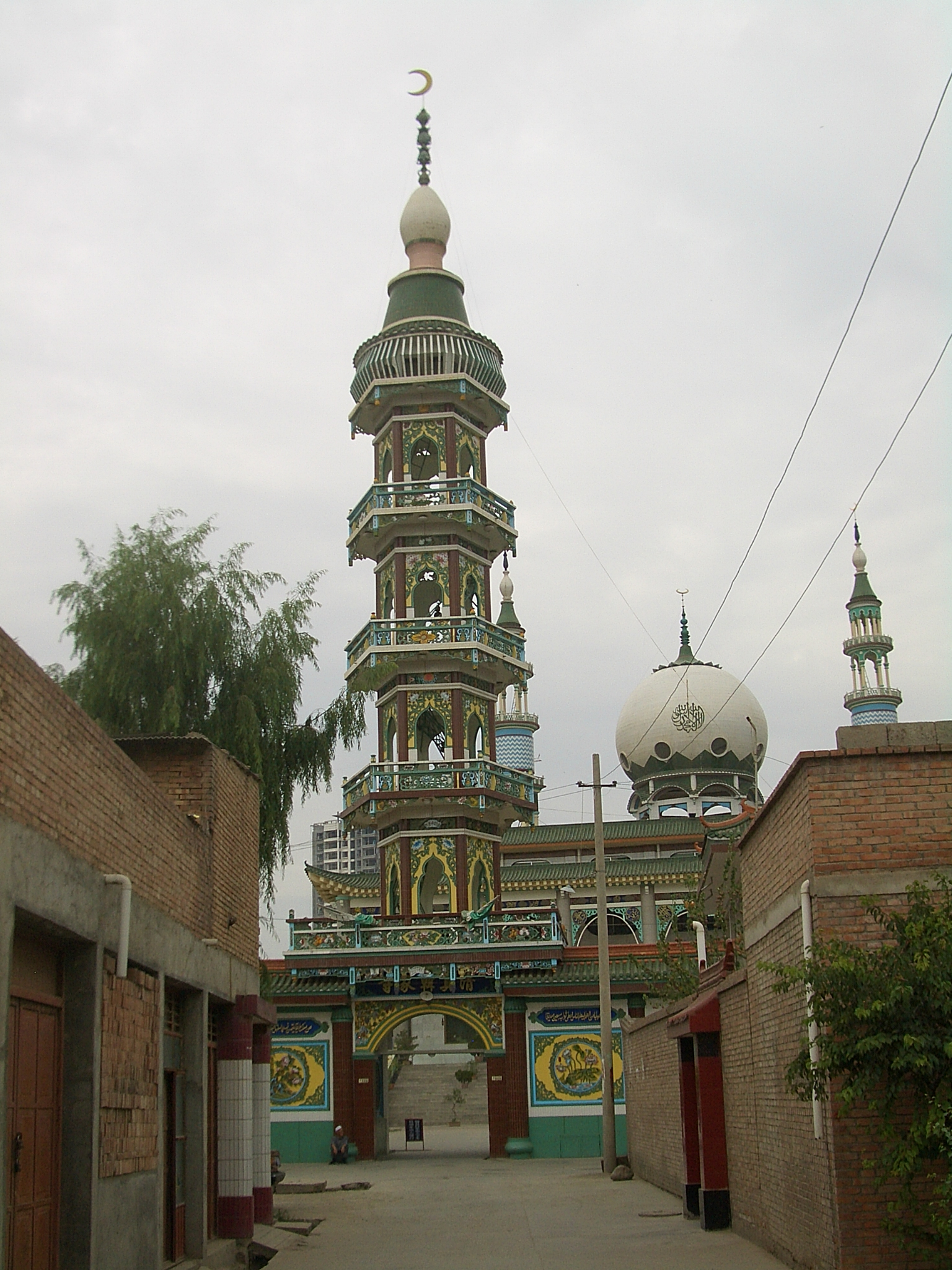
Hanjia Mosque

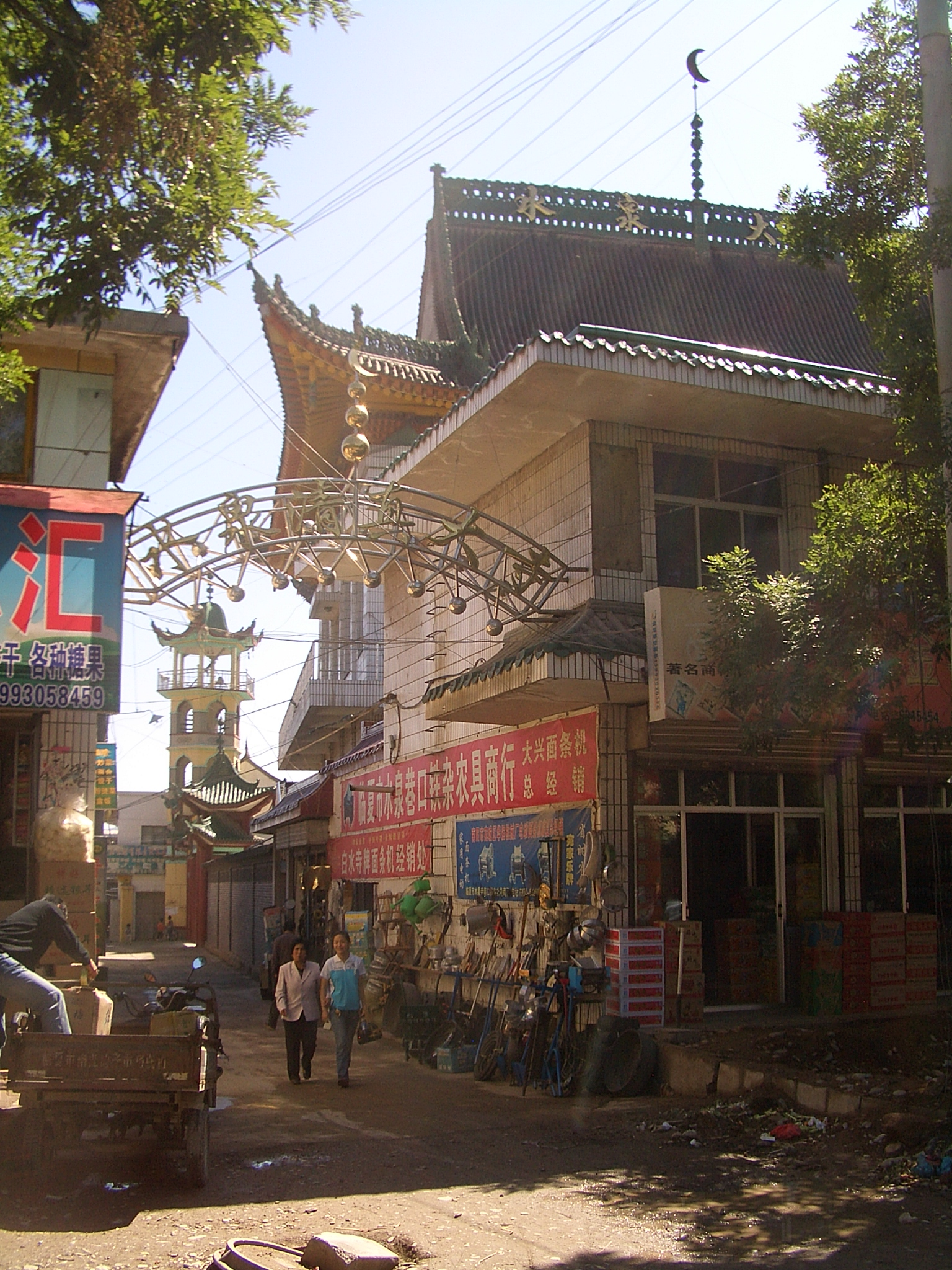
Shuiquan Mosque

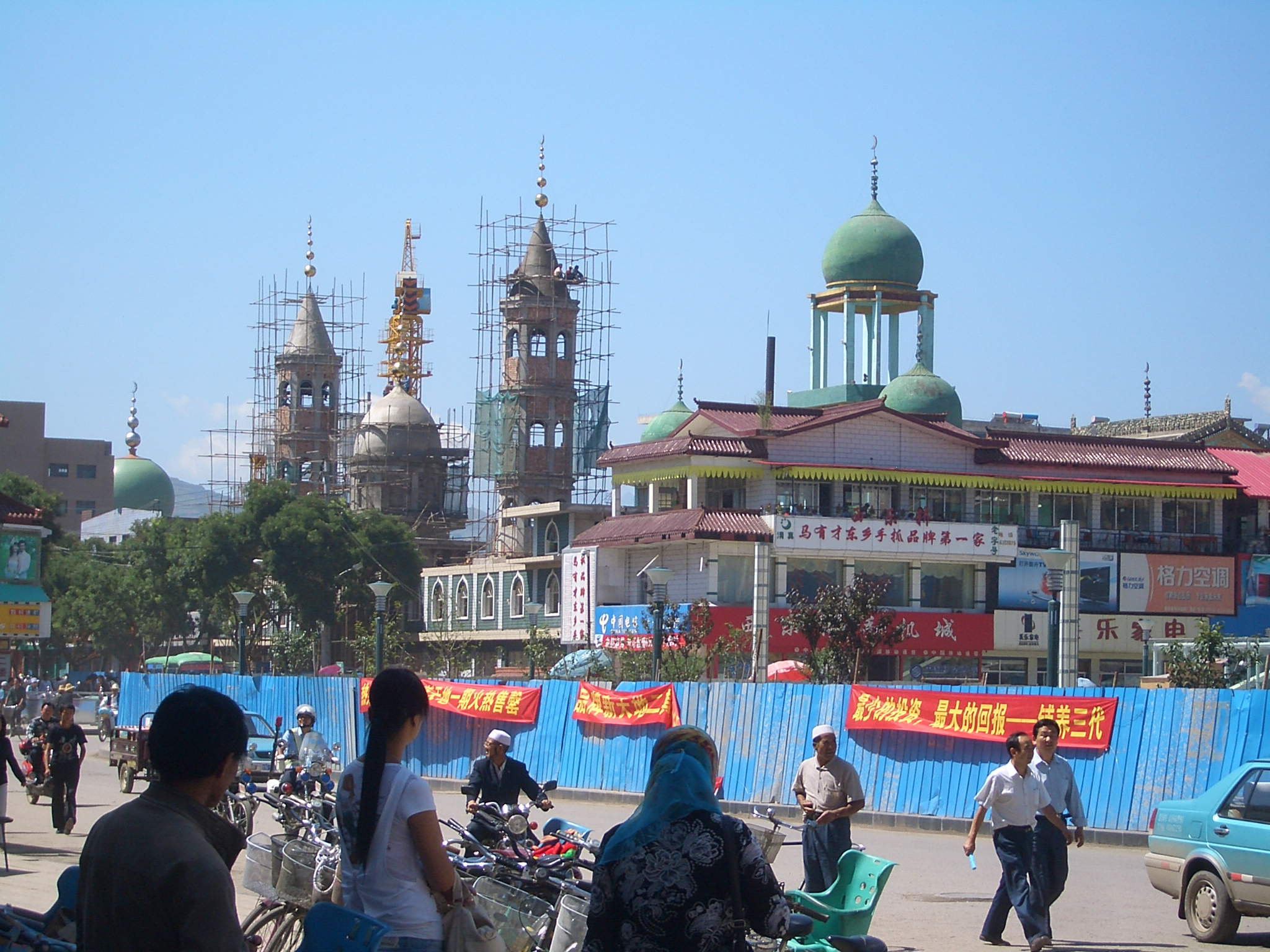
Nanguan Mosque

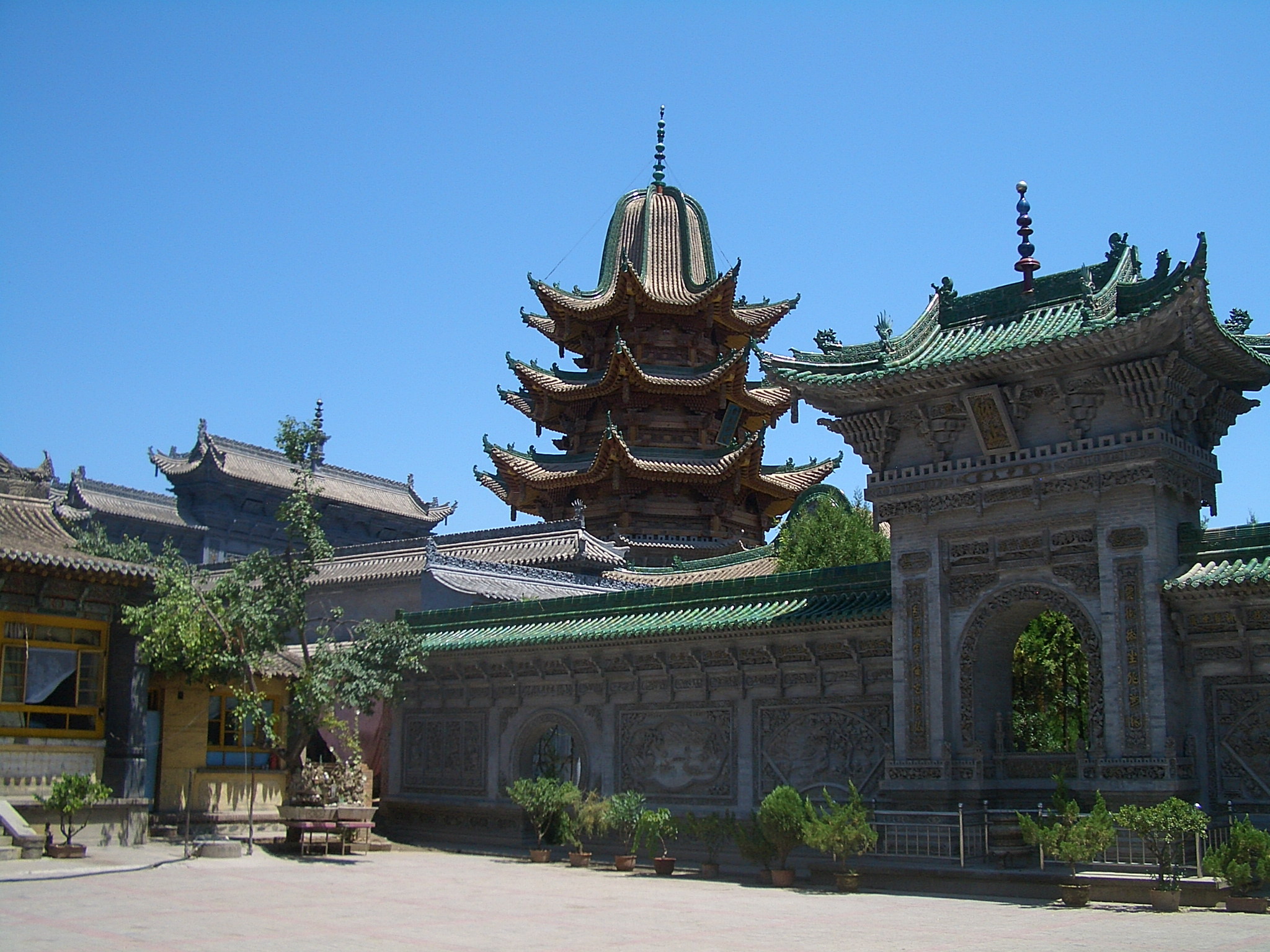
Yu Baba Gongbei

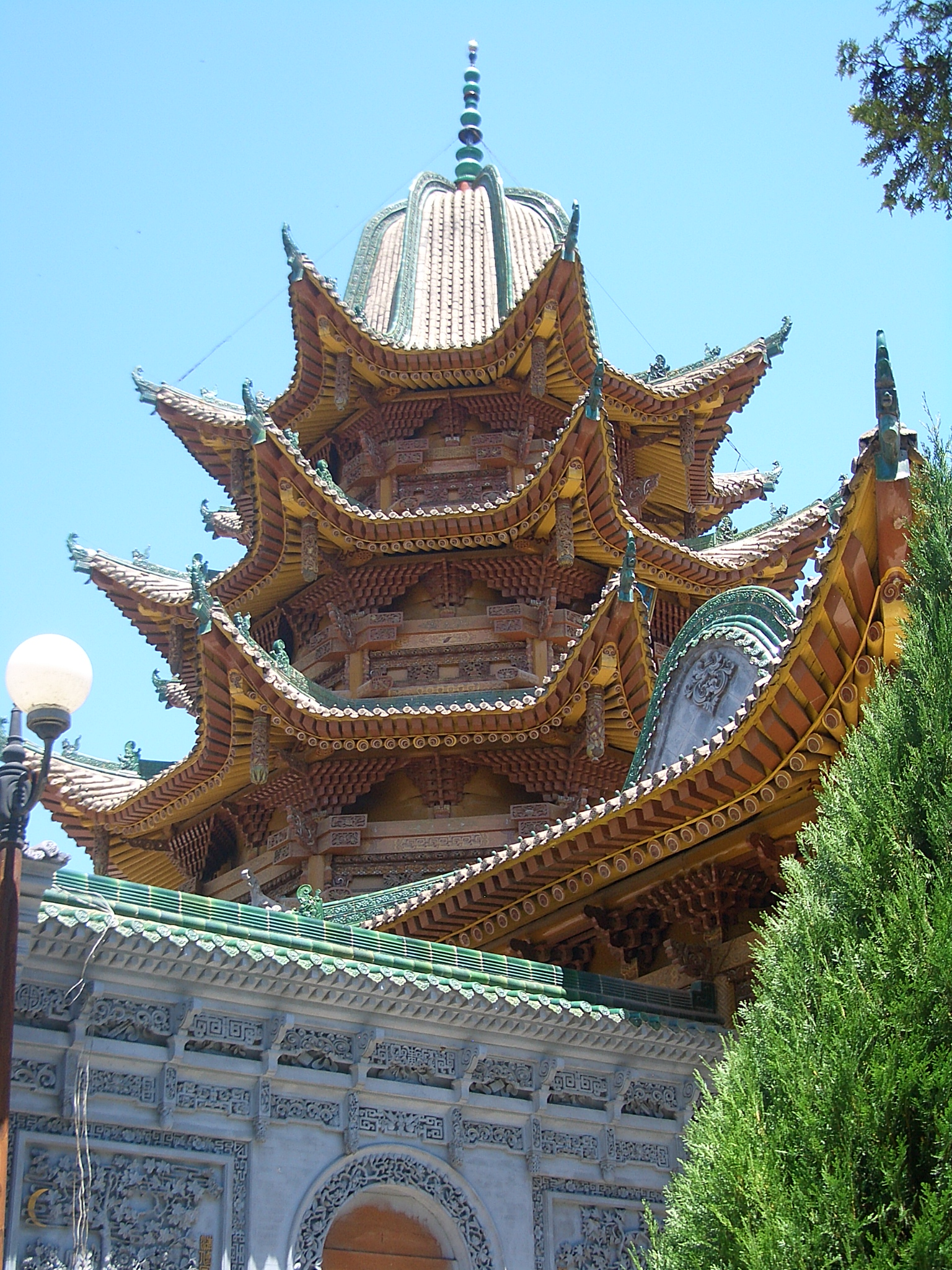
Yu Baba Gongbei main building

Linxia City's major gongbei shrine complexes are:

- Da Gongbei (大拱北, "The Great Gongbei"), next to Hongyuan Park northwest of the city center. Centered on the mausoleum of Qi Jingyi (1656–1719), it is the main center of the Qadiriyyah Sufi school in China.
- Tai Baba Gongbei (太爸爸拱北), on the west side. It is built around the mausoleum of Ma Tai Baba ("The Great Father Ma", 1632–1709), a disciple of Khoja Afaq and the teacher of Ma Laichi.
- Hua Si Gongbei (华寺拱北), on the west side. It includes the mausoleum of Ma Laichi and a large mosque (Hua Si, or Multicolored Mosque).
- Yu Baba Gongbei (榆爸爸拱北), also known as Bei Chengjiao Gongbei ("The Gongbei at the Northern Corner of the City Wall"), north of the city center.

There are also a number of smaller gongbeis throughout the city.

== Markets of Linxia City ==
Linxia City has long been the region's commercial hub. One of the traditional local products are a certain style of round glasses worn during the Qing dynasty that are still made there today.

== Administrative divisions ==
Linxia City is divided to 7 subdistricts and 4 towns.

Subdistricts

- Chengnan Subdistrict (城南街道, جٍْ‌نًا ڭِيَ‌دَوْ)
- Chengbei Subdistrict (城北街道, چٍْ‌بِيْ ڭِيَ‌دَوْ)
- Dongguan Subdistrict (东关街道, دْو‌قُوًا ڭِيَ‌دَوْ)
- Xiguan Subdistrict (西关街道, ثِ‌قُوًا ڭِيَ‌دَوْ)
- Bafang Subdistrict (八坊街道, بَافَانْ ڭِيَ‌دَوْ)
- Hongyuan Subdistrict (红园街道, خْویُيًا ڭِيَ‌دَوْ)
- Dongqu Subdistrict (东区街道, دْوٿِيُوِ ڭِيَ‌دَوْ)

Towns

- Chengjiao (城郊镇, چٍْ‌ڭِيَوْ جٍ)
- Yanhan (枹罕镇, یًاخًا جٍ)
- Nanlong (南龙镇, نًالْو جٍ)
- Zheqiao (折桥镇, جَ‌ٿِيَوْ جٍ)

== Transport ==
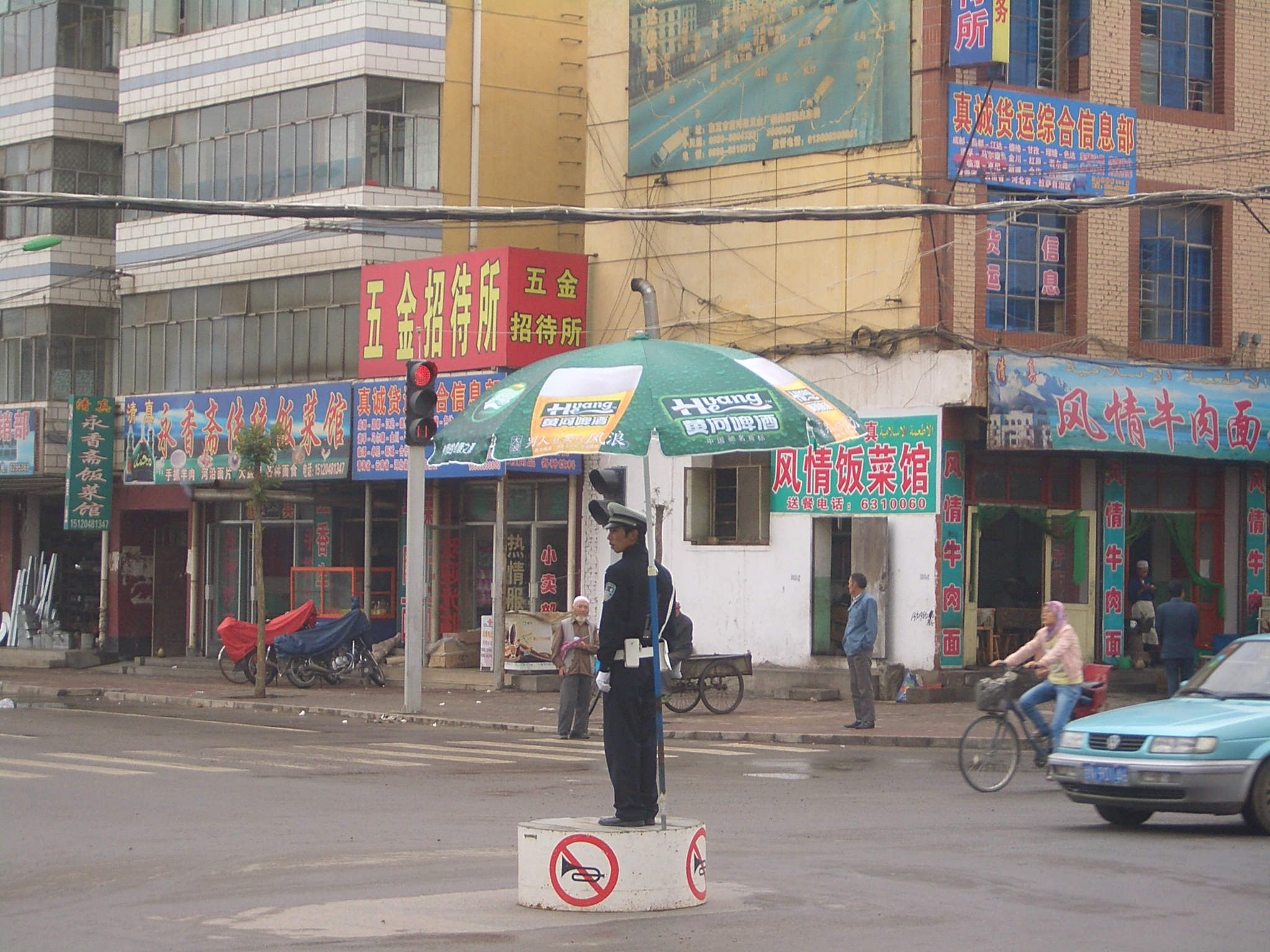
A policeman directs traffic in a Linxia street

Linxia City is the main transportation center of Linxia Hui Autonomous Prefecture. It is the junction of the prefecture's two main roads. China National Highway 213 (G213) runs from the northeast to the southwest, from Lanzhou via Yongjing County and Dongxiang Autonomous County to Linxia City, and then continue via Linxia County to Gannan Tibetan Autonomous Prefecture. Provincial route 309 (S309) comes from Lintao County in Dingxi City (to the east of Linxia Prefecture), and crosses Guanghe County and Hezheng County on its way to Linxia City; it then continues further west to Jishishan Bonan, Dongxiang and Salar Autonomous County.

Another important route, not yet designated as a national or state highway, allows for an alternative connection between Linxia City and Liujiaxia Town (the county seat of Yongjing County). It goes north from Linxia City, crosses a section of Linxia County and then, using ferry, the Liujiaxia Reservoir, and arrives to Liujiaxia Town from the west.

Linxia is also connected by G1816 Wuhai–Maqên Expressway. Travel time to Lanzhou via G75 Lanzhou–Haikou Expressway is around 2 hours, and to Hezuo takes around 90 minutes.

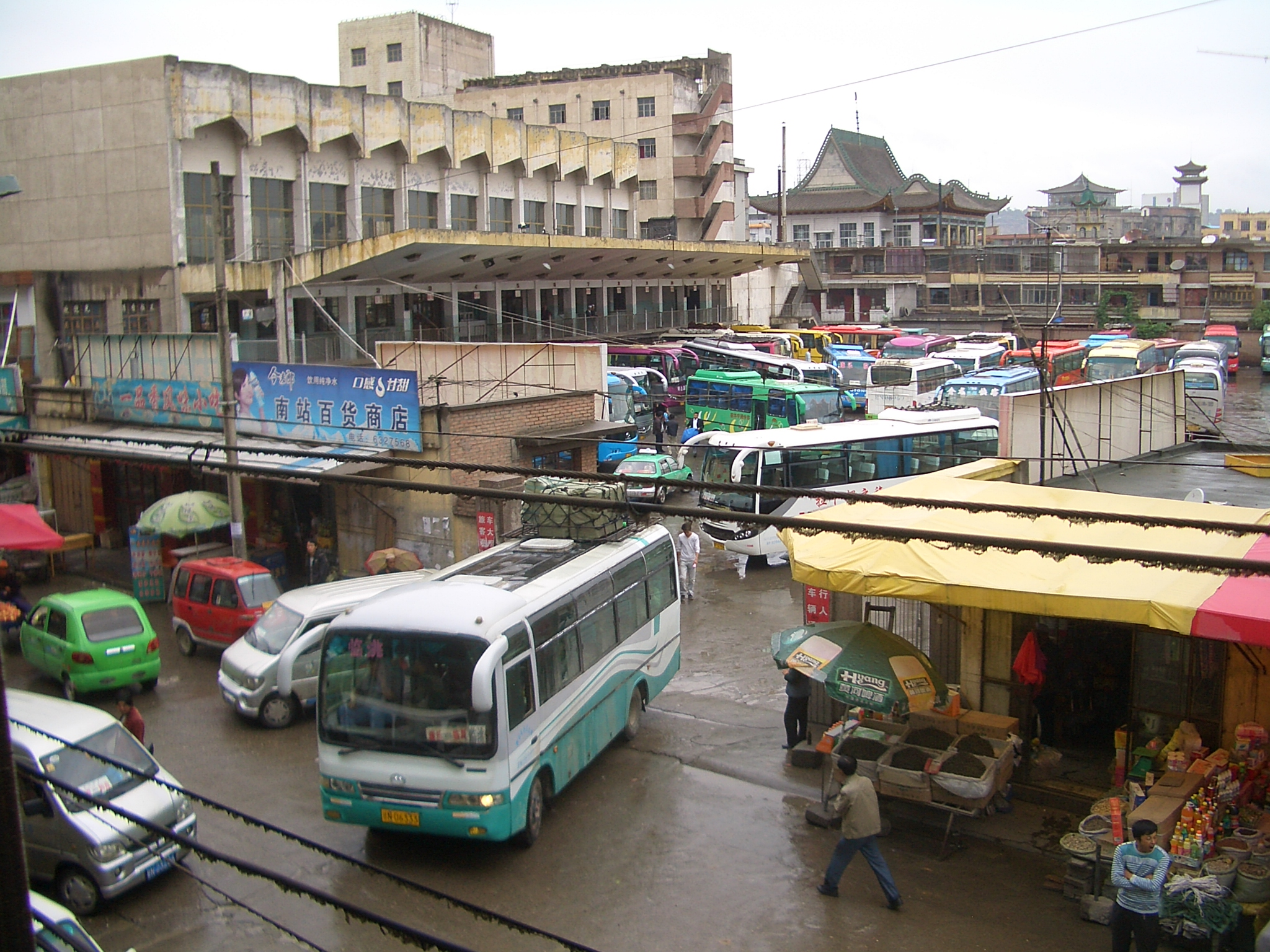
Linxia South Bus Station, with buses leaving for Lintao and Xiahe

There are three bus stations in Linxia City.

The South Bus Station, situated near the Daxia River bridge over which S309 enters the city from the southeast, is served by for frequent (hourly or half-hourly service) buses to Lanzhou, Xiahe, Hezuo, Kangle, Hezheng. The same South Bust Station and the West Bus Station (located on G213 in the northern part of the city) also have a number of departures every day to major cities throughout Gansu and to Xining in the neighboring Qinghai. The East Bus Station, located on G213 on the northeastern outskirts of the city, is primarily the hub for shuttle buses serving major towns in nearby counties.

There are no railways, airports, or navigable waterways near Linxia City, but the popular Lianhua Tai (莲花台) dock, also known as Lianhua Gudu (莲花古渡; 'Lianhua Old Ferry'), at the Liujiaxia Reservoir in the neighboring Linxia County serves as Linxia City's marine gate of sorts.

The city is served by a local public bus system with 13 routes.

The Lanzhou–Hezuo railway is under construction and will offer intercity service to Lanzhou and Hezuo.

== Sports ==
The Linxia Olympic Sports Centre Stadium is located in Linxia. The 20,000-capacity football stadium opened in 2016.

== Local Dialect ==
In Linxia the citizens speak a unique creole of Uyghur language and Mandarin Chinese called Hezhou language, characterised by its 3-tones and unique vocabulary borrowings from Arabic due to its local Islamic cultural influence.
