= Ma Dehan =

Hui Chinese artist and revolutionary

- 馬德涵
- Born: January 27, 1868; Xi'an, Shaanxi
- Died: May 20, 1958 (Aged 91); Xi'an, Shaanxi
- Resting place: Xi'an, Shaanxi
- Other names: Ma Dewei, Xiangzhi
- Occupations: Artist, Teacher, Revolutionary

Ma Dehan (Chinese: 馬德涵; Wade–Giles: Ma Te-han) was a Hui Chinese revolutionary. Born in Xiaopiyuan in Xi'an, he was active as a revolutionary in his hometown. He is known for meeting Chinese premier Zhou Enlai and assisting the Chinese Red Army's West Route Army.

== Early life ==
Ma Dehan's was born to a Hui family originating in Jiangning, Jiangsu. Born on January 27, 1868, in Xiaopiyuan, Xi'an. His father, Ma Yukun, was the personal doctor of Lai Wenguang, a military leader of the Taiping Rebellion, who moved to Shaanxi to treat civilians instead. Due to his family's lack of wealth, Ma Dehan could not afford to go to school, and was educated by his father, who taught him about values like kindness and bravery.

In 1894, Ma went to Chengdu, where he enrolled in the Sichuan Army Officer School and an art school. In 1906, he joined the Gelaohui and Tongmenghui, contributing to "Destroy the Imperial Order, Create New Harmony" revolutionary activities. He joined the Sichuan New Army as an officer. As a low-ranking officer, he was a part of the Railway Protection Movement. He was captured in mid-1911 by the Governor-General of Sichuan, Zhao Erfeng, along with other leading revolutionaries.

== Republican Era ==
After the Xinhai Revolution, Ma Dehan was responsible for military affairs in Sichuan and Gansu. As a Hui himself, Ma was dedicated to the ideals of equality between the Five Races. He was invited into the Provincial government of Gansu under Dujun (Military Governor) Ma Liang'an. As a teacher and someone deeply invested into educating Hui children, Ma started his own Islamic school. Starting from 1916, he worked for the Regional Defence Commander of Gansu and Ningxia, Ma Lin, as a training officer for his Ninghai troops. He also served as a tutor and art teacher for Ma Lin's wife and son, Su Buqing and Ma Buqing. Through this, he became close with Ma Fuxiang, Ma Anliang, and Ma Xiwu. According to Ma:

Working with Ma Anliang to organize the Army, I have a few things to do there, and with the Ma family I always have suggestions for them, and I introduced them to the Sichuanese peoples' Railway Protection Movement, to spread the ideals of the Tongmenghui.

In 1928, Ma Dehan headed home to Xi'an to tend for his old and sick mother. He noticed the many problems the city was facing. According to records throughout the entire province, 2 million were starving, 2 million were displaced, and 8 million were barely able to survive. In 1930, along with other prominent Hui figures such as Ma Ruisheng and Bai Chuzhen, Ma organized the Shaanxi Hui Disaster Relief Organization, accruing funds to assist local Hui people.

== Rescuing the West Route Army ==
After the Mukden Incident in 1931, Ma Dehan and the Shaanxi Hui Disaster Relief Organization declared that they would put another focus on resisting the Japanese. After the Xi'an Incident in 1936, Ma Dehan, with Ma Zhao and other figures joined the Shaanxi Hui Anti-Japanese Association, and started participating in Anti-Japanese activities with members of the Ma family warlords.

In December 1936, the Chinese Red Army's West Route Army, with a force of 25,000 reduced to 6,000, ended up in Xi'an, with many of their soldiers captured by the local Kuomintang forces (including those of Ma Buqing, Ma Dehan's student). In January 1937, in order to assist the Western Route Army, Zhou Enlai visited Xi'an, where he became friends with Ma Dehan and requested through him to speak to Ma Buqing. Zhou Enlai gave gifts to Ma Buqing using parts of a package of 1,000 Silver Yuans he received and told Ma Dehan that once he returned from Liangzhou (today Wuwei), he could go to Haizang Temple outside the North Gate to speak with a member of the Communist Party, where he could trade information with the local Communists. Ma then went to Liangzhou to meet with Ma Buqing to discuss starting a new art and calligraphy exhibition there. Due to their close teacher-student relationship, Ma Buqing was hospitable and arranged for Ma Dehan to stay in the South Hall of the Communications Office. Ma Dehan, bringing Zhou Enlai's gift, informed Ma Buqing about the plan to peacefully resolve the Xi'an Incident and asked him to help the Communists in creating a United Front against the Japanese. Upon hearing his, Ma Buqing suspected Ma Dehan on being a Communist. However, the two Hui politicians accompanying Ma Dehan helped explain their situation and further, and Ma Buqing eventually agreed to release his West Route Army prisoners. Ma Buqing wrote two letters, one (carried by Ma Dehan) ordering the mayor to mobilize his garrison brigades, and one sent to Qinghai to assist in the rescue of West Route Army prisoners.

In April 1937, while Kuomintang chairman of the Qinghai Provincial Government Ma Lin returned from his Hajj, he passed through Xi'an on his way to Xining. Upon hearing this, Zhou Enlai requested to meet with him. Due to the unsafe nature of official facilities, Ma Dehan invited Ma Lin to his house for a banquet, ordering a feast from the Hui restaurant Tianxilou to be sent to House No. 49 in West Yangshi. Ma Lin, accompanied by the Secretary-General of the Kuomintang Qinghai Provincial Government, Tan Kemin, arrived at the banquet, where they were introduced by Ma Dehan to Zhou Enlai. Ma Lin was initially shocked, but shook hands with Zhou and exclaimed:

Oh! Pleased to meet you, Mr. Zhou, it is a great honor to see you.

During the meeting, Ma Lin expressed his support for the Communist Party's idea of a United Front, and promised that he would return the imprisoned soldiers of the West Route Army. Later, Ma Dehan received news from fellow revolutionary Wu Hongbin that he had met with Ma Bufang with information about the captured West Route Army soldiers, which Ma Dehan relayed to the office of the Eighth Route Army in Xi'an. Because of Ma Dehan's efforts, 4,000 captured soldiers of the West Route Army were released by the Ma family. In the summer of 1938, Zhou Enlai thanked Ma Dehan, giving him a German-made hearing aid to help his hearing impairment, something he used until his death. Mao Zedong also told Zhou Enlai to give Ma Bufang a quilt and a coat made in the Shaan-Gan-Ning Border Region as appreciation for his efforts.

== Second Sino-Japanese War ==
During the Second Sino-Japanese War, Ma Dehan kept in touch with the Chinese Communist Party, going to the Eighth Route Army base in Xi'an on a monthly basis to discuss recent events. He circulated Communist newspapers around the Hui community, brought from Yan'an by the Eighth Route Army. According to the Xi'an Eighth Route Army office, by the first half of 1938, Ma sent six Hui youths to Yan'an to study. Ma recommended his sons Ma Wei, Ma Yi, and Ma Can to the Communist Party. Zhou Enlai then recommended Ma Yi to Guo Moruo, who arranged for him to do Anti-Japanese propaganda work for the National Government. When the front-lines reached Hankou, Zhou Enlai requested for Ma Yi to go home to Xi'an, and for him and Ma Dehan to stay there.

== Post-War Activities ==
In May 1949, when the Communists took Xi'an, Ma Dehan welcomed the Communists. On May 20, he instructed the local Hui people to have their water ready-boiled to welcome the Red Army while waving a small flag. Ma spoke at the victory conference after Xi'an was taken, stating that he supported the Red Army's initiative "to enter the northwest, liberate the northwest, and realize the motherland's reunification at an early date."

In June 1949, Hu Zongnan, commander of the Nationalist forces trying to retake the city, helped circulate rumors of a potential Communist genocide of the Hui people, and called for the Hui to "Work in collusion" and "Cooperate with the National Army". In order to counteract this, Ma Dehan and Ma Pingyu held talks in the mosque to promote Communist ideals about religion. The two also helped the Northwest Military and Political Committee in organizing a meeting for all races in Xi'an. They wrote a document about Muslim soldiers and officers, which was published in Masses' Daily (predecessor of Shaanxi Daily), which also published one of Ma Dehan's speeches, advocating for the CCP, titled "Ma Dehan, on Behalf of the Hui people, Hopes for the Quick Establishment of a Democratic Coalition".

After the People's Republic of China was founded, Ma Dehan served as a representative of the People's Congress of Shaanxi Province and Xi'an, a member of the CCP, the deputy director of the Ethnic Affairs Commission of Shaanxi Province and Xi'an, and a member of the Shaanxi Provincial and Xi'an Municipal governments.

Zhou Enlai repeatedly introduced members of the Shaanxi Provincial Government to Ma Dehan, and enjoyed talking about his achievements, using him as a role model. In May 1955, while on his way back from the Bandung Conference, Zhou Enlai visited Xi'an and met with Ma, where he introduced Ma to Shaanxi governor Zhao Shoushan, clasping Ma's hand and saying "From now, if there's anything you want to say, say it to Zhao Shoushan, he'll take care of it."

In 1958, Ma Dehan fell ill, dying on May 20. The State Ethnic Affairs Commission announced it to the public, and Shaanxi Daily published an obituary later in the day. More than 3,000 people attended his funeral.
