= Muslim conflict in Gansu (1927–1930) =

- Part of Chinese Civil War
| Date | 1927–1930 |
| Location | Gansu, Qinghai, Ningxia |

Belligerents
| Muslim rebels Supported by: Fengtian clique | Guominjun; Tibetan Tusi chiefdom of Chone; Tibetan Buddhist Labrang Monastery |

Commanders and leaders
| Ma Tingxiang (executed); Ma Zhongying; Supported by: Zhang Zuolin | Feng Yuxiang; Ma Lin; Ma Hongbin; Tibetan Tusi chief of Chone, Yang Yiqing |

Strength
| Chinese Muslims | Guominjun army, including non-rebel loyalist Muslim forces Tibetan Buddhist militia |

The Muslim Conflict in Gansu broke out when a coalition of Muslim generals revolted against the Guominjun in 1927. Prominent among the rebels was Ma Tingxiang, the son of the General Ma Anliang, who received aid in the form of arms from Zhang Zuolin in Manchuria.

== Causes ==
Famine, natural disaster, and use of their land for planting opium precipitated the rebellion of the people of Gansu under Guominjun rule.

Two Muslim Hui Generals, Ma Tingxiang and Ma Zhongying raised the flag of revolt, and attacked Guominjun forces throughout Gansu, participating in sieges of Hezhou.

The fighting was often brutal. The revolt degenerated from an anti-Guominjun movement into general ethnic and religious conflict with Muslims, with mass atrocities on both sides.

Throughout the revolt, some Muslim Generals like Ma Fuxiang did not join in the revolt, remaining officially as a part of the Guominjun, and appealing for peace. At the end, Ma Fuxiang and his son Ma Hongkui defected to the Kuomintang without doing any fighting.

Some Muslim Generals like Ma Lin remained on the Guominjun's side and fought the rebels.

== The revolt ==
A revolt led by Ma Tingxiang (Ma T'ing-hsiang) (馬廷勷) (a son of Ma Anliang) in the spring of 1928 broke out among the Hui people in Gansu province against the Guominjun of Feng Yuxiang. The Fengtian clique under Zhang Zuolin sent weapons shipments to Ma to aid him in his revolt.

The American botanist Joseph Rock saw the fighting between the Hui Muslim warlord Ma Qi and the Tibetan Buddhists of Labrang Monastery. Even more brutal fighting broke out when war between Zhang Zuolin's Fengtian clique happened against the Guominjun warlord Feng Yuxiang in 1925, autumn. The position of Gansu governor was taken by Feng Yuxiang. Only Muslim warlords were left after many of the non-Muslim warlords were expelled by Liu Yufen's Guominjun army of 15,000 soldiers as acting governor under Feng Yuxiang. A huge amount of taxes was extracted for Feng by Liu Yufen after an earthquake and famine brought about by drought. Then in Hezhou a revolt against Liu Yufen was led in Liangzhou by Hui Muslim warlord Ma Tingxing (son of Ma Anliang) in 1928, Spring. Hui, Dongxiang and Salar Muslims were recruited to also siege Hezhou in the army of 10,000 by Ma Zhongying, who was related to Ma Qi. Ma Zhongying's Muslim soldiers were starving and numbered 25,000 by November so that attacked the Tao river valley in the south, slaughtering Tibetan Buddhist monks, burning the palace of the Tibetan Tusi chief king Yang Jiqing, sacking the Tibetan city of Chone and defeated Yang Jiqing's 3,000 strong Tibetan militia. Tibetan areas all across southern Gansu were laid waste to. Tibetan militias defended Taozhou from Ma Tingxing. The Tibetans inflicted heavy casualties upon Ma Tingxian so he supported Ma Zhongying's Muslim forces and together they ravaged and destroyed the Taozhou-Chone region destroying and burning Tibetan areas. The Muslims burned the printing presses and temple of the Tibetan Buddhists in Chone. The Muslims then looted the gompa and massacred the Tibetan Buddhist monks of the Labrang monastery after fleeting from Liu Yufen in January 1929. 2 million died in the war as villages and towns across Gansu's south and east were destroyed during the war when Ma Zhongying was fighting as Feng Yuxiang attacked him. The Chone temple and palaces were rebuilt by the Tibetan Tusi chief king Yang Jiqing after the 1928-1929 war. The rebellion was put down by Feng Yuxiang and Gansu became peaceful again until the 1935 when the communist Long March came.

Linxia (Hezhou) was often plagued by these frequent rebellions. The entire southern suburbs of the city (ba fang) "eight blocks" was ruined in 1928 by savage fighting between the Muslims and Guominjun forces.

Ma Lin defeated Ma Ting-hsiang (Ma Tingxiang).

Ma Tingxiang was attacked by the Muslim General Ma Hongbin who was serving in Feng's administration in Ningxia.

Ma Zhongying, a Hui commander led three separate attacks against Feng's forces in Hezhou, and the following year, traveled to Nanjing and pledged his allegiance to the Kuomintang, attending the Whampoa Military Academy and promoted to General. Ma Zhongying also fought against his great uncle Ma Lin (warlord), who was a Muslim General in Feng Yuxiang's army, defeating him when Ma Lin attempted to retake Hezhou. The slogan of the rebels was "don't kill Hui, don't kill Han, only kill the officers of Guominjun" "不杀回，不杀汉，只杀国民军的办事员".

Hui Muslims belonging to the Xidaotang sect and Tibetans in Taozhou were attacked by Hui Muslim leader Ma Zhongying and his own Hui Muslim soldiers, causing panicked exodus of Xidaotang Hui Muslims.

The Kuomintang incited anti Yan Xishan and Feng Yuxiang sentiments among Chinese Muslims and Mongols, encouraging for them to topple their rule.

The revolt ended with all the Muslim Generals and Warlords, like Ma Qi, Ma Lin, and Ma Bufang reaffirming their allegiance to the Kuomintang government after defeating the Guominjun.

Ma Zhongying and Ma Fuxiang travelled to Nanjing to pledge allegiance to the Kuomintang and Chiang Kai-shek. Ma Fuxiang was promoted, and Ma Zhongying was trained at the Whampoa Military Academy under Chiang, making secret agreements for a future invasion of Xinjiang.

By 1931 the rebellion stopped totally.

Ma Tingxiang first rebelled against Feng and the Guominjun, then defected to Chiang Kai-shek and the Kuomintang after Chiang and Feng went to war against each other, and finally after Chiang dismissed Ma from his posts, attempted to flee and was captured by Feng and executed in 1929.

Ma Zhongying's 1928 revolt led to a blaze which destroyed the Multicoloured Mosque.

== See also ==
- Chinese Civil War
- Central Plains War
