= Golok conflicts (1917–1949) =

Conflict between Golok people and the Ma Clique

Amdo–Ma clique conflicts
| Date | 1917–1949 |
| Location | Qinghai |
| Result | Stalemate |

Belligerents
| (Taiwan) Republic of China | Amchok and Golok Amdo Tibetans |

Commanders and leaders
| (Taiwan) Chiang Kai-shek; (Taiwan) Ma Qi; (Taiwan) Ma Bufang | Unknown |

Strength
| National Revolutionary Army: Several thousand Hui Chinese soldiers of the Qinghai Army | Tribal Ngolok fighters |

Casualties and losses
| Unknown | Unknown |

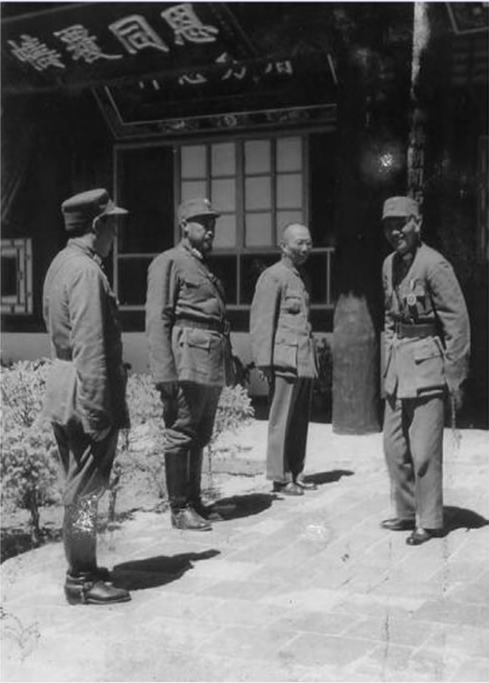
General Chiang Kai-shek (right) meets with Hui commanders Gen. Ma Bufang (second from left) and Gen. Ma Buqing (first from left) in Xining in August 1942.

The Ma clique fought a series of military campaigns between 1917 and 1949 against unconquered Amchok and Ngolok (Golok) tribal Tibetan areas of Qinghai (Amdo), undertaken by two Hui commanders, Gen. Ma Qi and Gen. Ma Bufang, on behalf of the Beiyang and Kuomintang governments of the Republic of China. The campaigns lasted between 1917 and 1949. The conflict was spurred by multiple factors, notably for economic and socio-political reasons (including intertribal tensions) rather than by any racial or religious enmity.

== The war ==
General Ma Qi was a Hui Chinese commander who joined the Kuomintang after the Northern Expedition in 1927–1928. His forces were composed entirely of Hui Chinese, organized in the Ninghai Army, which was then turned into a National Revolutionary Army division.

=== Battles for Labrang ===
Ma Qi occupied Labrang Monastery in 1917, the first time non-Tibetans had seized it. Ma Qi defeated the Tibetan forces with his Hui Chinese troops. His forces were praised by foreigners who traveled through Qinghai for their fighting abilities. The Labrang monastery had strong connections to the unpacified Ngolok Tibetan tribals who refused to submit to Chinese rule.

After ethnic rioting between Hui and Tibetans erupted in 1918, Ma Qi defeated the Tibetans. He heavily taxed the town for eight years. In 1925 a rebellion broke out, and tens of thousands of Tibetans drove out the Hui. Ma Qi responded with 3,000 Hui Chinese troops, who retook Labrang and machine-gunned Tibetan monks as they tried to flee. Ma Qi besieged Labrang numerous times but the Tibetans and Mongols fiercely resisted his Hui forces until Ma Qi gave it up in 1927. However, that was not the last Labrang saw of General Ma. The Hui forces looted and ravaged the monastery again. In revenge Tibetan nomads skinned alive many Hui soldiers. One of the most common practices was to slice open the stomach of a living soldier and then put hot rocks inside the stomach. Many Hui women were sold to the ethnic Han and Kazakhs. Children were adopted by the Tibetans.

Austrian-American explorer Joseph Rock witnessed the carnage and aftermath of one of the battles around 1929. The Ma Muslim army left Tibetan skeletons scattered over a wide area, and the Labrang monastery was decorated with severed Tibetan heads. After the 1929 Battle of Xiahe near Labrang, severed Tibetan heads were used as ornaments by Chinese Muslim troops in their camp, 154 in total. Rock described how the heads of "young girls and children" were staked around the encampment. Ten to fifteen heads were fastened to the saddle of every Muslim cavalryman. The heads were "strung about the walls of the Moslem garrison like a garland of flowers".

=== Ma Bufang's campaigns ===
Ma Bufang, the son of Ma Qi, was a Kuomintang warlord who dominated Qinghai. He served as a general in the National Revolutionary Army and sought to expand the Republic of China's control over all of Qinghai, as well as bringing Tibet back into the Republic by force. With the backing of the Kuomintang government, Ma Bufang launched seven expeditions into Golog, killing thousands of Ngolok Tibetans. Ma and his army, having established an Islamic state-within-a-state in Qinghai, exterminated many Tibetans in northeastern and eastern Qinghai. During one such attack in 1941 Ma Bufang sent Hui troops to destroy Sekar Gompa monastery, killing their highest ranking Lama and 300 tapas. They sacked the compound, burning it to the ground, and sold all of the property for gold and silver.

From 1918 to 1942 the Ma warlords waged intensive, violent war against the Ngolok tribal inhabitants of Golog. Ma Bufang also manufactured conflicts by giving pasture to Tibetan and Mongolian groups at the same time, which spread internal conflicts. Ma established the Kunlun middle school, which recruited mainly Han and Hui but also Tibetan students who were subjected to a harsh military life. Ma wanted to use them as translators as he expanded his military domain over land inhabited by Tibetans.

During the pacification, a war broke out between Qinghai and Tibet. Tibet attempted to capture parts of southern Qinghai province, following contention in Yushu, Qinghai, over a monastery in 1932. Ma Bufang's army vanquished the Tibetan forces and recaptured several counties in Xikang Province.

Ma Bufang succeeded in acquiring a personal monopoly on the Qinghai economy such as gold, wool, furs, animal skins, herbs. He also established trade relations and trade offices with Lhasa and Japanese-controlled Inner Mongolia. Tibetan tribals in southern Qinghai revolted against Ma Bufang's newly levied taxes in 1939–1941, but they were crushed by Ma cavalry forces' "suppression campaigns" and massacred, which caused a major influx of 2,000 households of Tibetan refugees into Tibet from Qinghai. This exodus triggered a crisis when Central Tibetan authorities feared that Ma Bufang might attack to pursue the refugees, but Ma resolved the matter by granting "amnesty" to "his Tibetan subjects".

Under orders from the Kuomintang government of Chiang Kai-shek, Ma Bufang repaired the Yushu airport in southern Qinghai Province, close to the border with Tibet, to prevent Tibetan separatists from seeking independence. Chiang also ordered Ma Bufang to put his Hui soldiers on alert for an invasion of Tibet in 1942. Ma Bufang complied, and moved several thousand troops to the border with Tibet. Chiang also threatened the Tibetans with aerial bombardment if they did not comply.

A former Tibetan Khampa soldier named Aten who fought Ma Bufang's forces gave an account of a battle. He described the Hui as "fierce". After he and his troops were ambushed by 2,000 Chinese Muslim cavalry, former soldiers of Ma Bufang, he was left with bullet wounds and "had no illusions as to the fate of most of our group", the majority of whom were wiped out. Aten also asserted that "the Tibetan province of Amdo" was "occupied" by Ma Bufang.

== Golog reactions ==
The Golog tribes were deeply resentful of the Muslim Ma warlords of Qinghai due to the brutality of the conflict. In response, in 1939, 1942 and 1949 Golog chieftains frequently sent appeals to Chinese central government representatives, including Tibetan communist leaders outside of Qinghai, to transfer the Golog lands from Qinghai province to Xikang (Kham) province and hence evade the Ma warlords' suppression. These requests were not acted upon, however, although the Golog in the early period People's Republic did not rebel as they perceived it as an improvement over the Ma warlords.

== See also ==
- Outline of the Chinese Civil War
