= Ma Bufang Mansion =

Mansion in Xining, Qinghai, China

Coordinates: 36.61761°N 101.80346°E

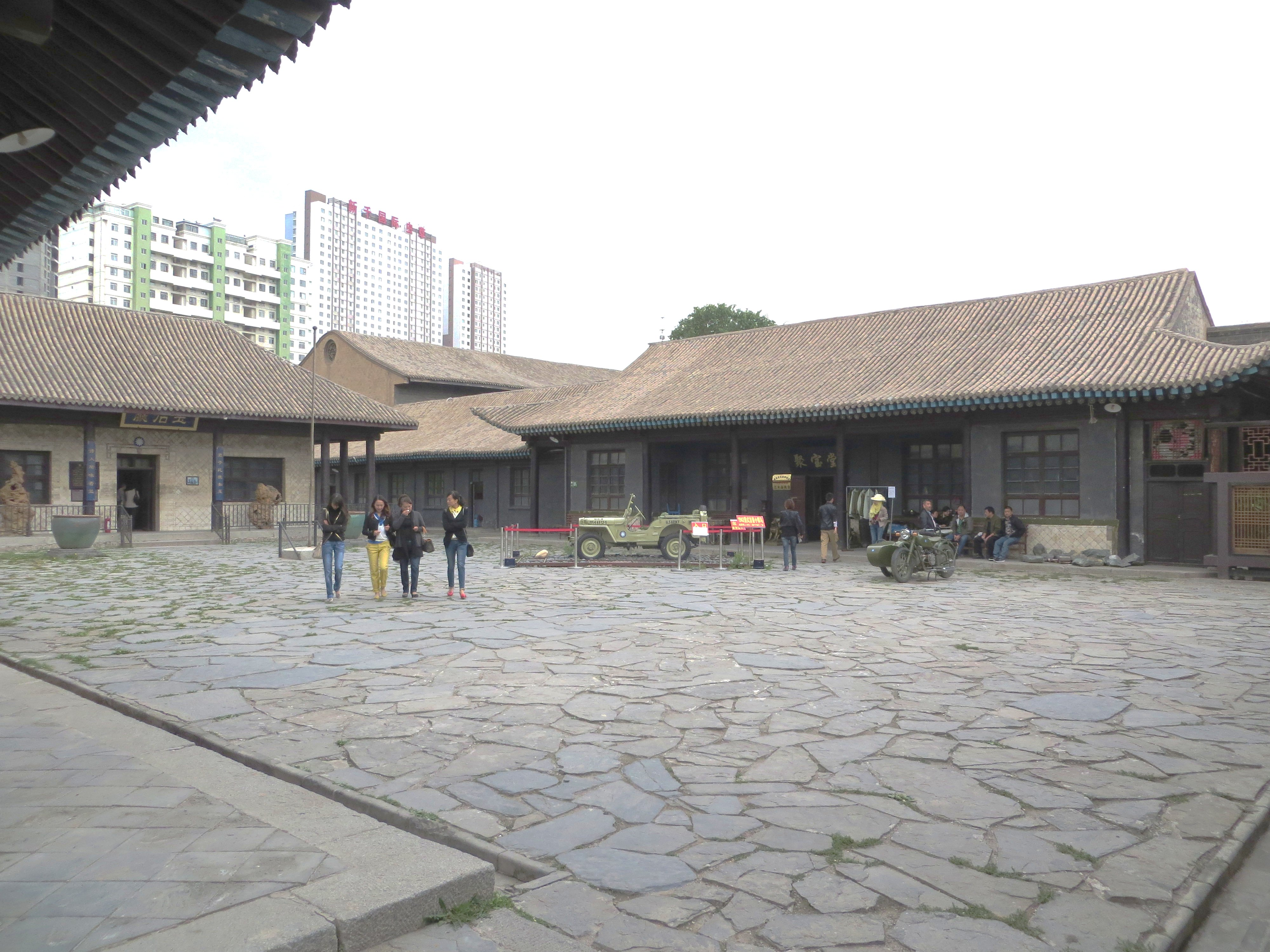
Ma Bufang Mansion

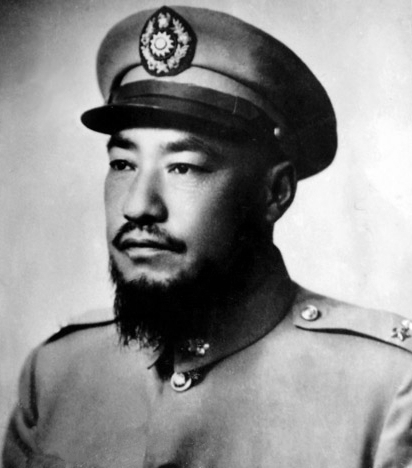
Ma Bufang

Ma Bufang Mansion (simplified Chinese: 马步芳公馆; traditional Chinese: 馬步芳公館; pinyin: MǎBùfāngGōngguǎn) was the mansion of the Chinese Muslim warlord and General Ma Bufang and his family from 1943 to 1949, and now is a tourist attraction, in Xining, Qinghai, China. Ma Bufang was a Kuomintang party member, so the mansion has numerous portraits of the Kuomintang founder Sun Yat-sen and Blue Sky with a White Sun flags.

It also includes many portraits of Ma Clique warlords.

Construction initiated in June 1942 and finished in June 1943. In total, the mansion comprises 290 rooms occupying 6,000 square meters of a plot of 30,000 square metres located in East District of the city.

== Links to Images of Ma Bufang Mansion ==
- 《马步芳公馆》小游
- 一个景点：马步芳公馆
- 馨庐：马步芳公馆一日游
- 青海之旅——马步芳公馆（组图）
- 那就是青藏高原---马步芳公馆
- 马步芳公馆
