= Ma Buluan =

- Born: 1905; Hezhou, Gansu, Qing China (now Linxia County, Gansu)
- Died: 1969 (aged 63–64); Egypt
- Military career
- Allegiance: Republic of China
- Branch: (Republic of China (1912–1949)) National Revolutionary Army
- Service years: 1931–1949
- Rank: Major General
- Conflicts: Second Sino-Japanese War; Chinese Civil War

Ma Buluan (1905–1969) (traditional Chinese: 馬步鑾; simplified Chinese: 马步銮; pinyin: Mǎ Bùluán; Wade–Giles: Ma Pu-luan, Xiao'erjing: ﻣَﺎ ﺑُﻮْ ﻟُﻮًا) was a Ma Clique general in the National Revolutionary Army, and a relative of Ma Bufang, the governor of Qinghai. He fought in the Second Sino-Japanese War and in the Chinese Civil War.

== Biography ==
He was born in modern Linxia County, Gansu. He joined the Ma clique army and participated in the first phase of the Chinese Civil War and the Second Sino-Japanese War. When the Chinese Civil War broke out again, he participated in the Heshui Campaign, Meridian Ridge Campaign, and the Ningxia Campaign. With the Kuomintang defeat in the Chinese Civil War, he went to Taiwan through Guangzhou, then later moved to Egypt. He died in Egypt in 1969.
