= Labrang Monastery =

Tibetan Buddhist monastery in Xiahe County, Gansu, China

- Tibetan transcription(s); Tibetan: བླ་བྲང་བཀྲ་ཤིས་འཁྱིལ་ Wylie transliteration: bla brang bkra shis 'khyil Official transcription (China): 拉卜楞寺; THL: Labrang Trashi Khyil
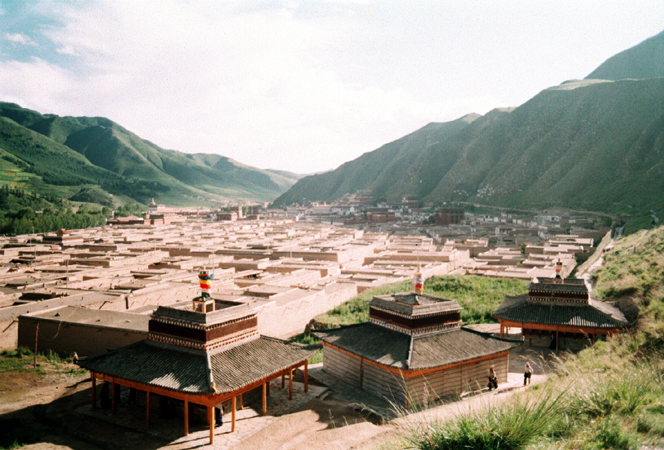
- Overview of the Labrang Monastery

- Location within China

Religion
- Affiliation: Tibetan Buddhism
- Sect: Gelug
- Festivals: January 4–17; June 26 – July 15

Location
- Location: Gansu Province
- Country: China
- Coordinates: 35°11′44″N 102°30′29″E

Architecture
- Founder: Ngawang Tsondru
- Established: 1709; 317 years ago

Labrang Monastery (Tibetan: བླ་བྲང་བཀྲ་ཤིས་འཁྱིལ་, Wylie: bla-brang bkra-shis-'khyil; Chinese: Lābǔléng Sì, 拉卜楞寺) is one of the six great monasteries of the Gelug school of Tibetan Buddhism founded by Je Lama Tsongkhapa. Its formal name is Genden Shédrup Dargyé Trashi Gyésu khyilwé Ling (Tibetan: དགེ་ལྡན་བཤད་སྒྲུབ་དར་རྒྱས་བཀྲ་ཤིས་གྱས་སུ་འཁྱིལ་བའི་གླིང༌།, Wylie: dge ldan bshad sgrub dar rgyas bkra shis gyas su 'khyil ba'i gling).

Labrang is located in Labrang Town of Xiahe (Sangqu) County, Gannan Tibetan Autonomous Prefecture, Gansu, in the traditional Tibetan area of Amdo. Labrang Monastery is home to the largest number of monks outside the Tibet Autonomous Region. Xiahe is about four hours by car from the provincial capital Lanzhou.

In the early part of the 20th century, Labrang was by far the largest and most influential monastery in Amdo. It is located on the Daxia River, a tributary of the Yellow River.

== History ==
The monastery was founded in 1709 by the first Jamyang Zhépa, Ngawang Tsöndrü. It is one of Tibetan Buddhism's most important monastery towns outside the Tibetan Autonomous Region.

Labrang Monastery is situated at the strategic intersection of two major Asian cultures—Tibetan and Mongolian — and was one of the largest Buddhist monastic universities. In the early 20th century, it housed several thousand monks. Labrang was also a gathering point for numerous annual religious festivals and was the seat of a Tibetan power base that strove to maintain regional autonomy through the shifting alliances and bloody conflicts that took place between 1700 and 1950.

In April 1985 the Assembly Hall burned down. It was replaced and the new building was consecrated in 1990.

In October 2025, Chinese authorities carried out a four-day raid focusing on the Monastery and surrounding Tibetan villages. The operation included door-to-door searches and the seizure of numerous Dalai Lama photographs, which were considered illegal under local and central regulations. Residents were pressured to hand over these images, and communications were cut off from October 19, restricting information about the raid's consequences.

== Description ==
The monastery complex dominates the western part of the village. The white walls and gilded roofs feature a blend of Tibetan and Indian Vihara architectural styles. The monastery contains 18 halls, six institutes of learning, a gilded stupa, a sutra debate area, and houses nearly 60,000 sutras.

At its height the monastery housed 4,000 monks. Like so many religious institutions, it suffered during the Cultural Revolution; and the monks were sent to their villages to work. After it was reopened in 1980, many of the monks returned; but the government restricted enrolment to around 1,500.

It has a Buddhist museum with a large collection of Buddha statues, sutras and murals. In addition, a large amount of Tibetan language books, including books on history are available for purchase, together with medicines, calendars, music and art objects.

There used to be a great gold-painted statue of the Buddha, more than 50 feet high, which was surrounded by rows of surrounding Buddhas in niches.

In the early 1930s, American journalist and explorer spent several months in Lhabrang, even befriending Alakh Jamv Japa. His book Through Forbidden Tibet contains many in-depth descriptions of the monastery and surrounding town, as well as of leaders in the monastic community and events of the 1930s. He attempted to persuade the leadership at Lhabrang to start an air force to fend off imperialistic actions from all directions. From his much deeper descriptions:

Since Lhabrang is the fourth largest gomba in all Tibet, pilgrims sometimes travel many hundreds of miles to worship at an circumambulate its holy shrines and idol-houses. Holiest of all was the Ju Kong--Alakh Jamv Japa's private chapel. And though it was a sacred inner shrine of shrines, the Living God himself took me therein. And I marvelled at the quietly impressive golden idol, seated Buddha-wise in the midst of an enormous lotus, and enthroned upon a huge golden canopied dais. Lengths of coloured silks--monster kadakhs--hung in long drapes. Upon the walls and pillars were priceless rugs and tungkahs--worth a fortune in any of the world's art and curio marts. Exquisitely wrought golden sacramental vessels and other articles used in the holy rituals rested upon an altar at the base of the idol, reflecting the flickering light from hundreds of tiny butter-lamps, which burned eternally. Hour upon hour Jamv Japa would spend in meditative solitude before this holy shrine, sheltered from the staring eyes of his worshippers. Yet they, nevertheless, knowing that this building housed his private chapel and that their Holiest of All Holies spent much time therein, kept up an incessant clockwise circumambulation about the outside...Not only did the faithful keep up a constant circumambulation of the Living Buddha's private palace but also about the huge chortens nearby, which were the mausoleums for the ashes of previous Living Buddha incarnations. There were three large chortens in Lhabrang. They looked like giant chessmen-bishops. The two whitewashed stone-and-stucco chortens were sixty feet at the base, towering seventy-five feet to the crescent-and-disk figure at their spire peaks. The third was the far-famed Golden Chorten. Its crescent-and-disk-tipped spire rose a hundred feet above the ground and was seventy-five feet on a side at its base. The whole superstructure of this chorten was covered with heavy sheets of beaten gold....In construction the chorten symbolized the elements: The base represented the earth; the inverted urn-like shape--water; the segmented spire--fire; the crescent--air; and the disk--ether (nothingness, or Nirvana). p.89-91

The monastery today is an important place for Buddhist ceremonies and activities. From January 4 to 17 and from June 26 to July 15 (these dates may change according to the lunar calendar), the great Buddhist ceremony will be held with Buddha-unfolding, sutra enchanting, praying, sutra debates, etc.

== Ma clique attacks ==
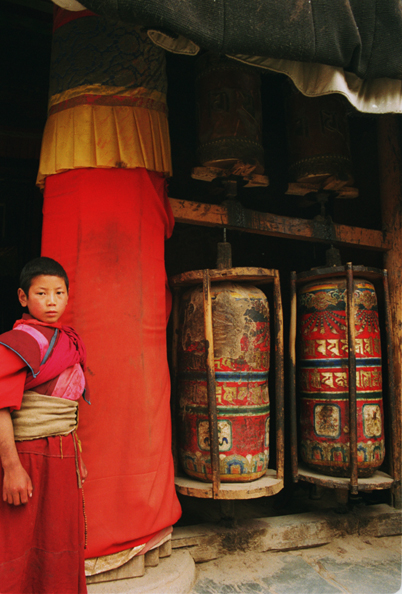
Young monk and prayer wheels

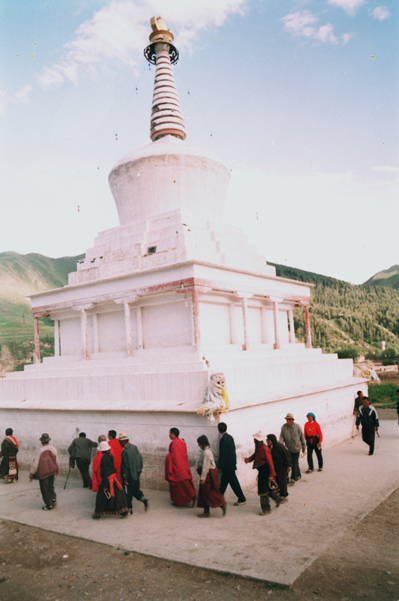
Circumambulation of a chorten by visitors

The Hui Ma clique under Generals Ma Qi and Ma Bufang launched several attacks against Labrang as part of a general anti-Golok Tibetan campaign.

Ma Qi occupied Labrang Monastery in 1917, the first time non-Tibetans had seized it. Ma Qi defeated the Tibetan forces with his Hui troops. His forces were praised by foreigners who traveled through Qinghai for their fighting abilities.

After ethnic rioting between Hui and Tibetans emerged in 1918, Ma Qi defeated the Tibetans. He heavily taxed the town for 8 years. In 1921, Ma Qi and his Muslim army decisively crushed the Tibetan monks of Labrang Monastery when they tried to oppose him. In 1925, a Tibetan rebellion broke out, with thousands of Tibetans driving out the Hui. Ma Qi responded with 3000 Hui troops, who retook Labrang and machine-gunned thousands of Tibetan monks as they tried to flee. During a 1919 attack by Muslim forces, monks were executed by burning. Bodies were left strewn around Labrang by Hui troops.

Ma Qi besieged Labrang numerous times. Tibetans fought against his Hui forces for control of Labrang until Ma Qi gave it up in 1927. However, that was not the last Labrang saw of General Ma. Ma Qi launched a genocidal war against the Goloks in 1928, inflicting a defeat upon them and seizing Labrang Monastery. The Hui forces looted and ravaged the monastery again.

The Austrian American explorer Joseph Rock encountered the aftermath of one of the Ma clique's campaigns against Labrang. The Ma army left Tibetan skeletons scattered over a wide area and Labrang Monastery was decorated with decapitated Tibetan heads. After the 1929 battle of Xiahe near Labrang, decapitated Tibetan heads were used as ornaments by Hui troops in their camp, 154 in total. Rock described the heads of "young girls and children" staked around the military encampment. Ten to fifteen heads were fastened to the saddle of every Muslim cavalryman. The heads were "strung about the walls of the Moslem garrison like a garland of flowers."

== Recent events ==
During the Tibetan uprising anniversary in March 2008, riot police surrounded Labrang monastery and military units blocked roads to keep local people from gaining access to the monastery. Monks were prevented from leaving by Chinese security forces and one civilian was held under arrest.
