= Ma Bukang =

Ma Bukang 馬步康
- Born: Gansu
- Military career
- Allegiance: Republic of China
- Service years: 1930s–1949
- Rank: General
- Nickname: Little Big Horse
- Conflicts: Second Sino-Japanese War, Chinese Civil War, Meridian Ridge Campaign

Ma Bukang (traditional Chinese: 馬步康; simplified Chinese: 马步康; pinyin: Mǎ Bùkāng; Wade–Giles: Ma Pu-k’ang, Xiao'erjing: ﻣَﺎ ﺑُﻮْ ﻛْﺎ) was a Chinese Muslim General and warlord and a member of the Ma Clique. Ma Bukang led a military force around Gansu in the Republic of China. His nickname was Little Big Horse. He controlled western Gansu after his cousin Ma Zhongying disappeared and left it vacant.

Ma Bukang and Ma Bufang were having a discussion on Ma Biao when Japanese warplanes bombed Xining.

He commanded the 8th Cavalry Division during World War II against the Japanese. Ma Bukang succeeded his relative Ma Biao as 8th Cavalry Division commander in the summer of 1942 and proceeded to battle the Japanese.

He fought against the Communists during the Meridian Ridge Campaign. He then fled to Saudi Arabia with Ma Bufang; however, after one year, they then moved to Cairo, Egypt.
