= Ma clique =

Hui political faction

- 馬家軍
- Active: 1862–1949
- Country: China
- Allegiance: Qing dynasty; Beiyang government; Nationalist government (1927–1949)
- Branch: National Revolutionary Army (after 1928)
- Engagements: First Dungan revolt; Second Dungan revolt; First Sino-Japanese War; Xinhai Revolution; Bai Lang Rebellion; Muslim conflict in Gansu; Sino-Tibetan War; Xinjiang Wars; Western Expedition (1936); Chinese Civil War; Second Sino-Japanese War

Commanders
- Governor of Gansu: Ma Anliang (1911–1918)
- Governor and Chairman of Qinghai: Ma Qi (1915–1931)
- Governor of Ningxia Governor of Gansu: Ma Hongbin (Note: Governor of Ningxia (1921–1928; 1948–1949) and Governor of Gansu (1930–1931))
- Governor of Qinghai: Ma Lin (1931–1938); Ma Bufang (1938–1949)
- Governor of Ningxia: Ma Hongkui (1931–1948)
- Tao-yins of Kashgar: Ma Fuxing and Ma Shaowu
- Commander of the New 36th Division: Ma Zhongying; Ma Hushan

Ma clique
- Traditional Chinese: 馬家軍(閥)
- Simplified Chinese: 马家军(阀)
- Literal meaning: Ma Family Army; Ma Family Military Clique
Transcriptions
Standard Mandarin
- Hanyu Pinyin: Mǎ Jiā Jūn(fá)
other Mandarin
- Xiao'erjing: ﻣَﺎ ﮐﯿَا کٌ ﻓَﺎ

The Ma clique or Ma family warlords is a collective name for a group of Hui (Muslim Chinese) warlords in Northwestern China who ruled the Chinese provinces of Qinghai, Gansu and Ningxia for 10 years from 1919 until 1928. Following the collapse of the Qing dynasty in 1912, the region came under Chinese Muslim warlord Ma Qi's control until the Northern Expedition by the Republic of China consolidated central control in 1928. After 1928, Muslim warlords joined the ruling Kuomintang government and participated in national-level politics alongside their local military role. There were three families in the Ma clique ("Ma" being a common Hui rendering of the common Muslim name "Muhammad"), each of them respectively controlled, parts of Gansu, Ningxia and Qinghai. The three most prominent members of the clique were Ma Bufang, Ma Hongkui, and Ma Hongbin, collectively known as the Xibei San Ma (Chinese: 西北三馬, Three Ma of the Northwest). Some contemporary accounts, such as Edgar Snow's, described the clique as the "Four Ma" (rather than Three), adding Ma Bufang's brother Ma Buqing to the list of the top warlords. Other prominent Mas included Ma Anliang, Ma Lin, Ma Hushan, Ma Fuxiang and Ma Zhongying.

== Ma clique ==
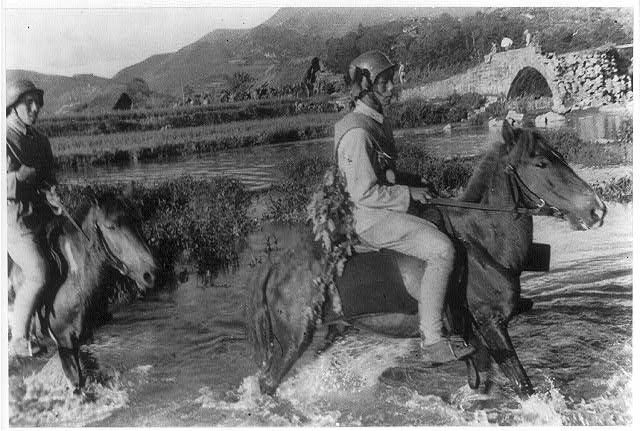
The Muslim family of General Ma Bufang, favorable to the defense of Chiang, to the fight against corruption of Feng Yuxiang in Noroeste

The Ma clique warlords were all generals in the military of the Republic of China, who controlled most of mainland China until it was overtaken by the communist People's Liberation Army. The clique was begun by Muslim generals who served in the military of the Qing dynasty, most notably in the Kansu Braves army, who fought in the Boxer Rebellion against invading foreign forces. It was continued by two generations of their descendants.

After the Xinhai Revolution overthrew the Qing, the Ma clique generals declared their allegiance to the Republic of China. Unlike the Mongols, Hui Muslims refused to secede from the Republic, and Ma Qi quickly used his diplomatic and military powers to make the Tibetan and Mongol nobles recognize the Republic of China government as their overlord, and sent a message to President Yuan Shikai reaffirming that Qinghai was securely in the Republic. He replaced "Long, Long, Long, Live the reigning Emperor", with "Long live the Republic of China" on inscriptions. Ma Anliang also agreed to join the new Republic of China government.

When the Kuomintang seized power in the Northern Expedition, the Ma clique warlords became members of the Kuomintang party, and their armies were renamed as divisions of the National Revolutionary Army. The Ma clique Ninghai Army under General Ma Qi was renamed the National Revolutionary Army 26th Division.

Ma Zhongying led the KMT 36th Division to fight against the pro-Soviet governor of Xinjiang, Jin Shuren during the Kumul Rebellion, and the Soviets themselves during the Soviet Invasion of Xinjiang. The 36th Division also crushed the First East Turkestan Republic at the Battle of Kashgar (1934).

In the Sino-Tibetan War, Ma clique forces led by Ma Bufang defeated the Tibetan Army. Also during the Kuomintang pacification of Qinghai, Ma Bufang waged war against Tibetan tribes in Qinghai to bring them under his control.

During the Second Sino-Japanese War, Ma clique forces fought against the Japanese, and Ma Hongbin led his 81st corps to defeat the Japanese at the Battle of Wuyuan. Ma Bufang sent Ma Biao to attack the Japanese army. 40 years before, Ma Biao had fought in the Boxer Rebellion against the Eight Nation Alliance.

Ma Bufang was ordered by the Kuomintang to invade Xinjiang in the 1940s to intimidate and help oust the forces of the pro-Soviet Governor Sheng Shicai. The Ma clique forces also clashed with the forces of the Second East Turkestan Republic during the Ili Rebellion.

== The three families of the Ma clique ==
The first family was headed by Ma Zhanao. He had two sons, Ma Anliang, and Ma Guoliang, both of whom became Qing generals. Ma Anliang later became a general in the Republic of China. Ma Anliang had five sons, three of whom were unknown. The other two were Ma Tingran and Ma Tingxian, who was executed in 1962 by the People's Court.

The second family was headed by Ma Qianling. Ma Hongbin and Ma Hongkui were cousins. Their respective fathers, Ma Fulu and Ma Fuxiang came from Yangzhushan (阳注山) village in Hanji Town (presently, the county seat of Linxia County), and were half-brothers. Ma Fulu and Ma Fuxiang's father Ma Qianling, originally a small merchant and farmer from Hezhou, had been an associate of Ma Zhan'ao – the ruler of Hezhou region during the Great Muslim Rebellion of the 1860s – and went over to the Qing government's side in 1872 along with Ma Zhan'ao himself; rewarded by the government and successful in his business, he had four sons with his three wives. Ma Zhanao was the father of another 2 Ma clique warlords, Ma Anliang and Ma Guoliang. Ma Qianling also had several nephews who died along with Ma Fulu in the Boxer Rebellion.

Ma Haiyan started the third family. He had two sons, Ma Qi, and Ma Lin. Ma Qi had 2 sons, Ma Buqing and Ma Bufang, originally from Monigou Township (漠泥溝鄉) in Linxia County. Their father, Ma Qi (1869–1931), was based in Xining, controlling what is today Qinghai Province. Ma Zhongying was Ma Qi's nephew, and thus a cousin of Ma Buqing and Ma Bufang. Ma Hushan was also a member of this family. This family controlled Qinghai province. One Generation of this family had the same Generation name, 步 (Bù), Ma Bufang, Ma Buqing, Ma Bukang, Ma Buluan, and Ma Zhongying (whose original name was Ma Buying) all had the Bu character in their names and were of the same generation, all being grandsons of Ma Haiyan.

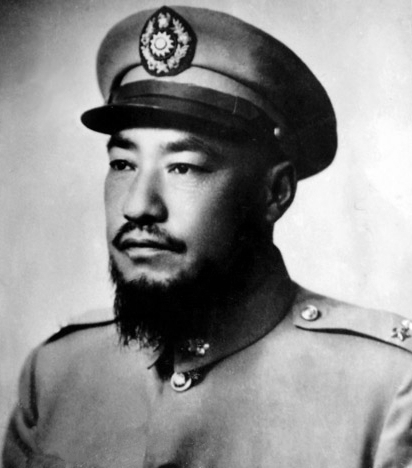
Ma Bufang

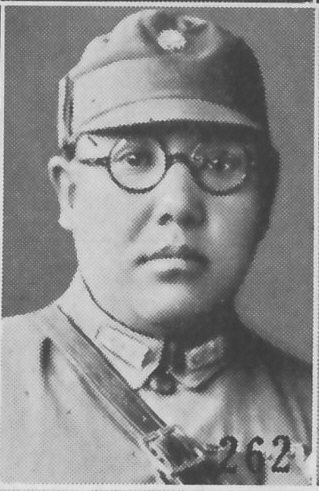
Ma Hongkui

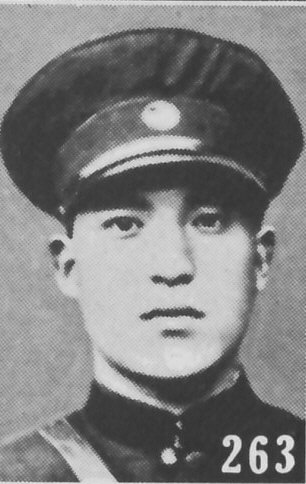
Ma Zhongying

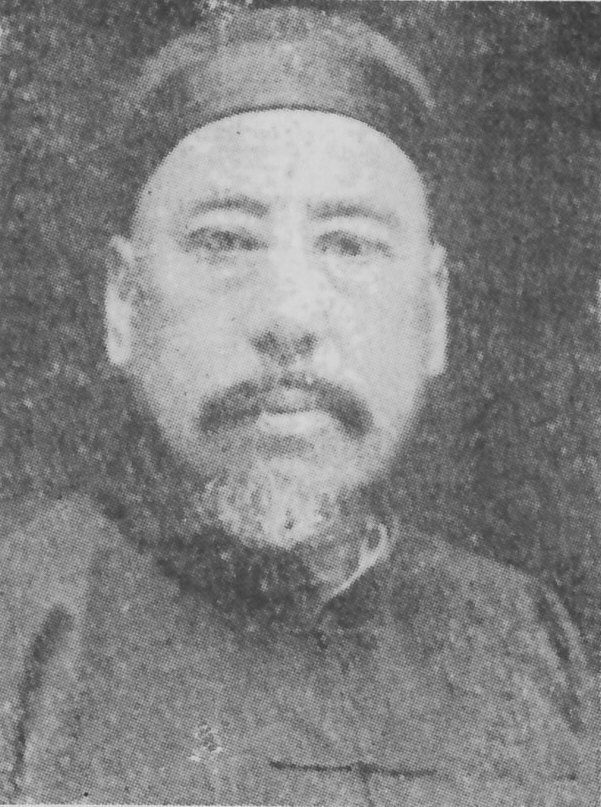
Ma Lin

== History ==
The Ma clique traces its origins to the officers of Qing dynasty General Dong Fuxiang. General Ma Anliang was the de facto leader of the Muslims of northwest China.

The Three (or Five) Ma took control of the region during the Warlord Era, siding first with the Guominjun and then the Kuomintang; they fought against the Red Army during the Long March and the Japanese during the Second Sino-Japanese War.

The Ma Clique controlled vast amounts of land in the northwest, including Xining and Hezhou.

The Qing dynasty had granted Ma Bufang's family a yellow standard which had his family name "Ma" on it. Ma Bufang continued to use this standard in battle.

Ma Bufang recruited many Salar officers from Xunhua County into his army like Han Yimu and General Han Youwen.

During one campaign against the Communists in the Civil War, in Gansu, Qinghai, and Ningxia, Muslim soldiers numbered 31,000.

During the final stages of the Chinese Civil War, the Ma fought for the Kuomintang side in defiance until the communists wiped out his cavalry and took Gansu in August 1949, just months before the establishment of the People's Republic of China. Upon the arrival of communist forces, Ma Hongbin had little possibility of winning and joined to communists' side. He was appointed vice-chairman (later restyled vice-governor) of Gansu province. He later died in Lanzhou in 1960. Ma Hongkui fled with the Kuomintang to Taiwan. He was indicted by Republic of China Control Yuan as a scapegoat. He later migrated to the United States, where he died on 14 January 1970.

Ma Bufang with his son Ma Jiyuan fled by an airplane from Qinghai to Chongqing, then Hong Kong. In October 1949, Chiang Kai-shek urged him to return to the Northwest to resist the PLA, but he chose to migrate to Saudi Arabia with more than 200 relatives and subordinates, in the name of hajj. He later worked as the first ambassador to Saudi Arabia for the Republic of China.

Ma Lin's eldest son Ma Burong defected to the Communists after 1949 and donated 10,000 Yuan to support Chinese troops in the Korean War. One of Ma Chengxiang's Hui officers, Ma Fuchen, defected to the Communists.

Ma Guoliang's son Ma Tingbin became a member of the Chinese People's Political Consultative Conference after defecting to the Communists.

== List of Ma clique generals and officers ==
=== First family ===
- Ma Zhanao
- Ma Anliang
- Ma Guoliang
- Ma Suiliang
- Ma Tingxiang
- Ma Tingxian
- Ma Tingbin aka Ma Quanqin
- Ma Jieqin

=== Second family ===
- Ma Qianling
- Ma Fuxiang
- Ma Fulu
- Ma Fushou
- Ma Fucai
- Ma Hongbin
- Ma Hongkui
- Ma Dunjing (1906–1972)
- Ma Dunjing (1910–2003)
- Ma Dunhou (Ma Tung-hou)
- Ma Dunren

==== Officers ====
- Ma Fuxing
- Ma Chiang-liang

=== Third family ===
- Ma Haiyan
- Ma Haiyuan
- Ma Qi
- Ma Lin
- Ma Bao
- Ma Guzhong
- Ma Liang (general)
- Ma Yuanxiang
- Ma Bufang
- Ma Buqing
- Ma Bukang
- Ma Buluan
- Ma Burong
- Ma Buyuan
- Ma Zhongying (Ma Buying)
- Ma Zhenwu
- Ma Hushan
- Ma Xuyuan
- Ma Weiguo
- Ma Jiyuan
- Ma Chengxiang
- Ma Biao (general)
- Ma Burong

==== Officers ====
- Han Youwen
- Han Yimu
- Ma Zhancang
- Ma Fuyuan
- Ma Shiming
- Ma Ju-lung
- Pai Tzu-li
- Ma Sheng-kuei
- Su Chin-shou
- Ma Xizhen

== Family trees ==
Below are the family trees of the Ma Clique. These trees are not exhaustive.

=== First family ===
Ma Zhanao (Ma Zhan'ao or Ma Chan-ao) 馬占鰲
Ma Anliang (Ma An-liang) 馬安良	Ma Guoliang (Ma Kuo-liang) 馬國良	Ma Suiliang (Ma Sui-liang) 馬遂良
Ma Tingxiang (Ma T'ing-hsiang) 馬廷勷	Ma Tingxian (Ma T'ing-hsien) 馬廷賢	Ma Tingbin (Ma T'ing-pin) 馬廷斌 aka Ma Quanqin 馬全欽

=== Second family ===
Ma Qianling (Ma Ch'ien-ling) 馬千齡
Ma Fushou (Ma Fu-shou) 馬福壽	Ma Fucai (Ma Fu-ts'ai) 馬福財	Ma Fulu (Ma Fu-lu) 馬福綠	Ma Fuxiang (Ma Fu-hsiang) 馬福祥
Ma Hongbin (Ma Hung-pin, misspelled as Ma Hung-ping) 馬鴻賓	Ma Hongkui (Ma Hung-kuei or Ma Hung-kwei) 馬鴻逵
Ma Dunjing (Ma Tun-ching) 馬惇靖	Ma Dunhou (Ma Tun-hou, misspelled as Ma Tung-hou) 馬敦厚	Ma Dunjing (Ma Tun-ching) 馬敦靜	Ma Dunren (Ma Tun-jen) 馬敦仁

=== Third family ===
Unknown
Ma Haiyuan (Ma Hai-yüan) 馬海淵	Ma Haiyan (Ma Hai-yan) 馬海晏
Ma Bao (Ma Pao) 馬寶	Ma Guzhong (Ma Ku-chung)	Ma Qi (Ma Ch'i) 馬麒	Ma Lin 馬麟
Ma Zhongying (Ma Chung-ying) 馬仲英 (Ma Buying, Ma Pu-ying 馬步英)	Ma Buqing (Ma Pu-ch'ing) 馬步青	Ma Bufang (Ma Pu-fang) 馬步芳	Ma Burong (Ma Pu-jung) 馬步榮	Ma Buyuan (Ma Pu-yüan) 馬步援
Ma Xuyuan (Ma Hsü-yüan) 馬緒援	Ma Weiguo (Ma Wei-kuo) 馬衛國	Ma Jiyuan (Ma Chi-yüan) 馬繼援

== Other notable family members ==
Outer notable family members include:

- Ma Mingxin
- Ma Yuanzhang
- Ma Shenglin

== List of wars fought by the Ma clique ==
- Dungan Revolt (1862–1877)
- Dungan Revolt (1895–1896)
- First Sino-Japanese War (1894–95)
- Boxer Rebellion (1899–1901)
- Xinhai Revolution (1911)
- National Protection War (1915–1916)
- Muslim conflict in Gansu (1927–1930)
- Golok conflicts (1917–1949)
- Chinese Civil War (1927–1949)
- Kumul Rebellion (1931–1934)
- Sino-Tibetan War of 1930–1932
- Soviet invasion of Xinjiang (1934)
- Western Expedition (1936)
- Xinjiang War (1937)
- Second Sino-Japanese War (1937–1945)
- Ili Rebellion (1944–1949)
- Kuomintang Islamic insurgency (1950–1958)

== See also ==
- Warlord Era
- History of the Republic of China
- List of Warlords
