= Ma Buqing =

Republic of China warlord (1901–1977)

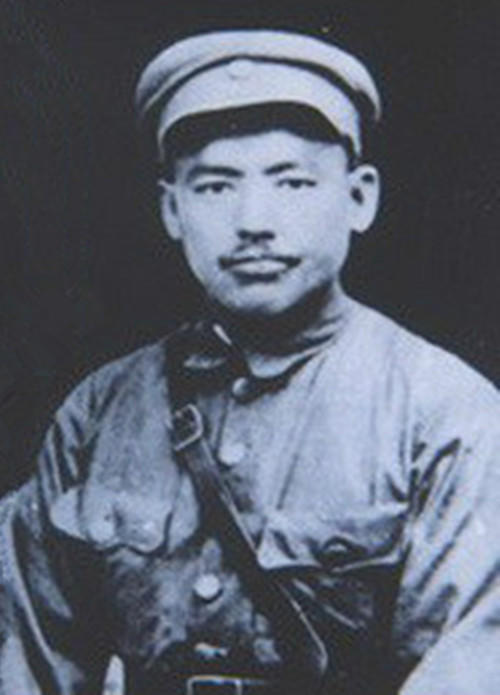

Reclamation Commissioner Qinghai Province
- In office 1942–1943

Personal details
- Born: 1901 Linxia County, Gansu
- Died: 9 February 1977 (aged 75–76) Taipei, Taiwan
- Party: Kuomintang
- Children: Ma Xuyuan, Ma Weiguo

Military service
- Allegiance: China
- Years of service: 1928–1949
- Rank: general
- Commands: Reclamation Commissioner Qinghai Province, Deputy Commander in Chief 40th Army Group
- Battles/wars: Long March, Second Sino-Japanese War, Chinese Civil War

Ma Buqing (1901–1977) (simplified Chinese: 马步青; traditional Chinese: 馬步青; pinyin: Mǎ Bùqīng; Wade–Giles: Ma Pu-ch’ing, Xiao'erjing: مَا بُ‌ٿِئٍ) was a prominent Ma clique warlord in China during the Republic of China era, controlling armies in the province of Qinghai.

== Life ==
Ma Buqing and his younger brother Ma Bufang (1903–1975) were born in Monigou Township (漠泥沟乡) in what is today Linxia County, some 35 kilometres (22 mi) west of Linxia City. Their father Ma Qi formed the Ninghai Army in Qinghai in 1915, and received civilian and military posts from the Beiyang Government in Beijing in that same year confirming his military and civilian authority in Qinghai.

Ma Buqing received a Confucian Classical Chinese education, while his brother Ma Bufang received education in Islam to become an Imam.

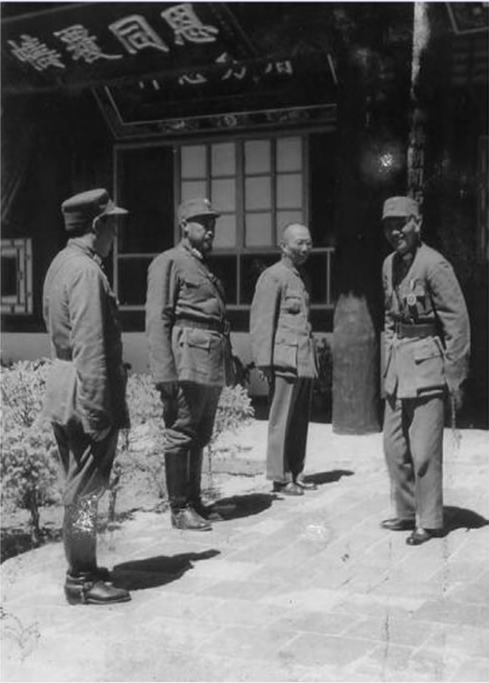
Chiang Kai-shek (right) meets with the Muslim Generals Ma Bufang (second from left), and Ma Buqing (first from left) at Xining in August 1942.

Ma Buqing sided with Feng Yuxiang's Guominjun until the Central Plains War, when he switched to the winning side of Chiang Kai-shek. Ma Qi died in 1931 and his power was assumed by his brother Ma Lin, who was appointed governor of Qinghai.

Ma Buqing watched Chinese Opera, and met the later American Professor John DeFrancis during an opera performance.

His troops defeated the CCP during the Long March in 1936.

Ma Buqing and Ma Bufang discussed battle plans against the Japanese over the telephone with Chiang Kai-shek. Ma Buqing's Hexi 5th Army entered the war against the Japanese. In 1940 at the Battle of Wuyuan, Ma Buqing led the 5th Cavalry Corps against the Japanese. The Japanese were defeated by the Chinese Muslim cavalry and Wuyuan was retaken from the Japanese.

Ma Buqing was in virtual control of the Gansu corridor at this time.

In 1942 Generalissimo Chiang Kai-shek, head of the Chinese government personally went on tour in Northwestern China in Xinjiang, Gansu, Ningxia, Shaanxi, and Qinghai, where he met both Ma Buqing and Ma Bufang. Ma Buqing's troops were involved in road construction, for the movement of war supplies to Chinese forces fighting against Japan, having built a route to the Soviet Union and was planning another route via Tibet.

In July 1942 Chiang Kai-shek instructed Ma Buqing to move 30,000 of his troops to the Tsaidam marsh in the Qaidam Basin of Qinghai. Chiang named Ma Reclamation Commissioner, to threaten Sheng Shicai's southern flank in Xinjiang, which bordered Tsaidam. Liangzhou District in Wuwei was previously his headquarters in Gansu, where he controlled 15 million Muslims.

In 1949, Ma Buqing evacuated with his family to Taiwan along with the Kuomintang Republic of China government becoming advisor to the Ministry of Defense. His brother, Ma Bufang, fled to Egypt. Ma Buqing died on 9 February 1977, in Taipei.

A daughter of Ma Buqing married Ma Buqing's nephew Ma Chengxiang who was born in 1914. Ma Chengxiang commanded the 5th cavalry army and joined Ma Buqing on Taiwan.

Ma Buqing's eldest son was Ma Xuyuan (Chinese: 馬緒援; Wade–Giles: Ma Hsü-yüan), and his other son was Ma Weiguo (Chinese: 馬衛國; Wade–Giles: Ma Wei-kuo).

== Career ==
- 1926 Commanding Officer 55th Independent Brigade, 5th Army
- Commanding Officer 65th Brigade, 22nd Division
- Luoyang Garrison Commander
- 1929–1937: General Officer Commanding 5th Cavalry Division
- 1937–1942: General Officer Commanding 5th Cavalry Army
- 1942–1943: Reclamation Commissioner Qinghai Province
- 1943–1945: Deputy Commander in Chief 40th Army Group

== See also ==
- Ma clique
