= Rakya Monastery =

Buddhist monastery in Qinghai, China

Coordinates: 34.6890°N 100.6544°E

Ragya Monastery
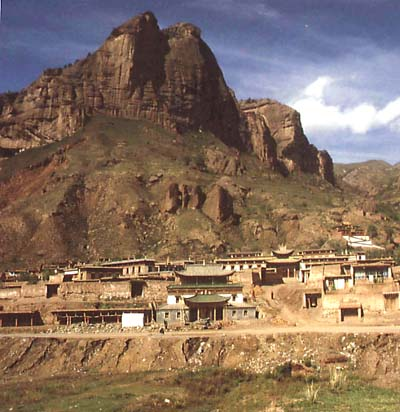

Religion
- Affiliation: Tibetan Buddhism

Location
- Location: Qinghai, China
- Country: China
- Interactive map of Ragya Monastery

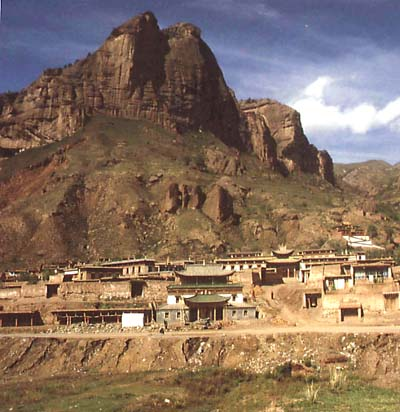
Rakya Monastery in 1998

Rakya Monastery is a Buddhist monastery in Qinghai, China.
