= Ninghai Army =

Ninghai Army (1915–1926) renamed as 26th Division (National Revolutionary Army)
- Active: 1915–1926 1926–1931
- Country: Republic of China
- Allegiance: Republic of China
- Branch: Independent unit then incorporated into the National Revolutionary Army
- Size: Division
- Garrison/HQ: Xining, Qinghai
- Equipment: rifles, swords, machine guns
- Engagements: Kuomintang Pacification of Qinghai

Commanders
- Ceremonial chief: Ma Qi
- Notable commanders: Ma Qi, Ma Buqing, Ma Bufang

Ninghai Army
- Traditional Chinese: 寧海軍
- Simplified Chinese: 宁海军
Transcriptions
Standard Mandarin
- Hanyu Pinyin: Nínghǎi Jūn
- Wade–Giles: Ninghai Chun
other Mandarin
- Xiao'erjing: نٍ ﻫَﻰْ کٌ

The Ninghai Army, later the 26th Division (National Revolutionary Army) was a Muslim Hui army of the Republic of China commanded by General Ma Qi, who controlled the Xining area of Qinghai, then a special region of Gansu province. It was founded by Ma Qi in 1915.

== Composition and history ==
The Ninghai Army was made up of Hui Muslims. The name "Ninghai" was applied to the armies of the Republic of China around the region of Ningxia-Qinghai.

Ma Qi led the Ninghai Army in November 1918 to seize and garrison Labrang monastery from the Tibetans. It left in 1927.

The Tibetan Golok people, owing allegiance to Labrang, attacked the Muslim Ninghai Army several times. The Chinese had never been able to control the Goloks before. However, this time, the Muslim Ninghai Army brought their modernized weapons, and exterminated a group of Goloks. The Muslim army then called for negotiations, during which they slaughtered the Goloks, killing "men, women and children", and drowned thousands of them in the Yellow River. A Christian missionary praised the Muslim army for exterminating the Goloks, saying that it was "God", who enabled the Muslim victory. After Tibetans attacked the Ninghai Muslim army in 1922 and 1923, the Ninghai army returned in 1924 and crushed the Tibetans, killing numerous Tibetans.

At Ganjia and Serchentang, General Ma Bufang defeated Tibetans under Gonpo Dondrup on 27 June 1924 and 25–27 April 1925. The Tibetans suffered severe casualties.

In 1925, a Tibetan rebellion broke out, with thousands of Tibetans driving out the Muslims. Ma Qi responded with 3,000 Chinese Muslim troops, who retook Labrang and machine gunned thousands of Tibetan monks as they tried to flee.

When Ma Qi joined the Kuomintang, the Ninghai army was reorganized into the National Revolutionary Army 26th Division, under Ma Qi's command.

Wei Fu-chih was born in Kao-lan district in Gansu in 1895, his alma mater was Paoting Military Officers' College, and among the positions he held was battalion commander in artillery corps of the Ninghai Army.

== Notable people ==
List of people who served in the Ninghai Army

- Ma Qi
- Ma Buqing
- Ma Bufang
- Ma Xizhen

== See also ==
- Hui people
