= Ma Qi =

Chinese Muslim General

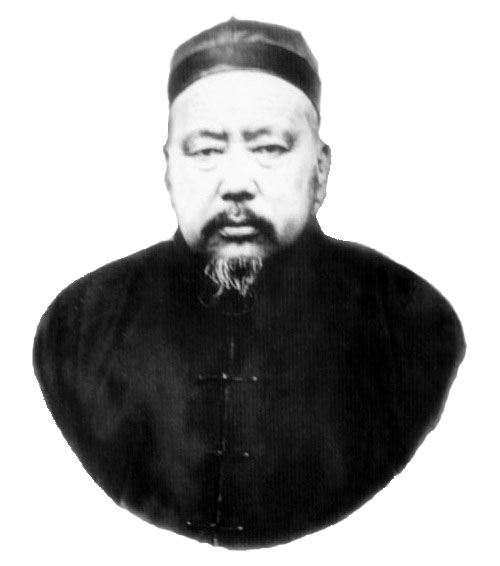
- Ma Qi

Military Governor of Qinghai
- In office Oct 1915 – Dec 1928
- Preceded by: Lian Xing (Lien Hsing)
- Succeeded by: Sun Lianzhong (as Chairman)

Chairman of the Government of Qinghai
- In office Sep 1929 – May 1931
- Preceded by: Sun Lianzhong (Sun Lien-chung)
- Succeeded by: Ma Lin (warlord)

Personal details
- Born: 23 September 1869 Linxia County, Gansu, Qing China
- Died: 5 August 1931 (aged 61) Xining, Qinghai, Republic of China
- Party: Kuomintang
- Children: Ma Bufang; Ma Buqing

Military service
- Allegiance: Qing Empire; Republic of China
- Years of service: 1890s–1931
- Rank: general
- Unit: Ninghai Army
- Commands: General of Xining
- Battles/wars: Dungan Revolt (1895-96), Boxer Rebellion, Xinhai revolution, Bai Lang Rebellion, Kuomintang Pacification of Qinghai

Ma Qi (simplified Chinese: 马麒; traditional Chinese: 馬麒; pinyin: Mǎ Qí; Wade–Giles: Ma Ch'i, Xiao'erjing: ﻣَﺎ ٿِ; 23 September 1869 – 5 August 1931) was a Chinese Muslim General in early 20th-century China.

== Early life ==
A Hui, Ma was born on 23 September 1869 in Daohe, now part of Linxia, Gansu, China. His father was Ma Haiyan and his brother was Ma Lin. He was a senior commander in the Qinghai-Gansu region during the late Qing dynasty. Ma Sala was said to be his father. Ma Qi led loyalist Muslim troops to crush Muslim rebels during the Dungan Revolt (1895).

During the Boxer Rebellion Ma Qi served with his father Ma Haiyan in Gen. Dong Fuxiang's Kansu Braves against the invading Eight Nation Alliance in Beijing. Ma Haiyan defeated the foreign army at the Battle of Langfang in 1900, and died while protecting the Imperial Family from the western forces. Ma Qi succeeded him in all his posts and capacities. Ma Qi was 6 feet (183 cm) tall and maintained the mintuan militia in Xining as his personal army, called the Ninghaijun. He also directly defied his commanding officer, Muslim Gen. Ma Anliang, when Ma Wanfu, the Muslim brotherhood leader, was being shipped to Gansu from Xinjiang by Yang Zengxin to Ma Anliang, so Ma Anliang could execute Ma Wanfu. Ma Qi rescued Ma Wanfu by attacking the escort and brought him to Qinghai. Ma Anliang hated the Muslim brotherhood, which he banned earlier, and sentenced all its members to death and wanted to personally execute Ma Wanfu because he was its leader.

During the Xinhai Revolution, Ma Qi fought Gelaohui revolutionaries in Ningxi, but when the Emperor abdicated Ma Qi declared support for the Republic of China. Ma Anliang, Changgeng and Shengyun failed to capture Shaanxi from the revolutionaries. In Ningxia, Qing forces were attacked by both Hui Muslim Gelaohui and Han Gelaohui members, while Hui general Ma Qi and Ma Yuanzhang were in the Qing forces fighting against them but Ma Yuanzhang defected to the republicans after Ma Anliang gave up on the Qing. Unlike the Mongols and Tibetans, the Muslims refused to secede from the Republic, and Ma Qi quickly used his diplomatic and military powers to make the Tibetan and Mongol nobles recognize the Republic of China government as their overlord, and sent a message to President Yuan Shikai reaffirming that Qinghai was securely in the Republic. He replaced "Long, Long, Long, Live the reigning Emperor", with "Long live the Republic of China" on inscriptions.

Ma Qi developed relations with Wu Peifu, who tried to turn Gansu military leaders against Feng Yuxiang. Feng's subordinate Liu Yufen expelled all the Han generals who opposed him, which resulted in Hui Generals Ma Hongbin, Ma Lin, Ma Tingxiang, and Han Gen. Bei Jianzhang, the commander of a Hui army, to stop fighting against Feng and seek an agreement.

== Republican times ==
In 1913 a Qinghai wool and hide bureau was established by Ma Qi. It put an export tax on the wool trade with foreigners.

In 1917 Ma Anliang ordered his younger brother Ma Guoliang to suppress a rebellion of Tibetans in Xunhua who rebelled because of taxes Ma Anliang imposed on them. Ma Anliang did not report it to the central government in Beijing and was reprimanded for it, and Ma Qi was sent by the government to investigate the case and suppress the rebellion.

Ma Qi formed the Ninghai Army in Qinghai in 1915. He occupied Labrang monastery in 1917, the first time non-Tibetans had seized it.

After ethnic rioting between Muslims and Tibetans broke out in 1918, Ma Qi defeated the Tibetans. He heavily taxed the town for eight years. In 1921 he and his Muslim army decisively crushed the Tibetan monks of Labrang monastery when they tried to oppose him. In 1925 a Tibetan rebellion broke out, with thousands of rebels driving out the Muslims. Ma Qi responded with 3,000 Chinese Muslim troops, who retook Labrang and machine-gunned thousands of Tibetan monks as they tried to flee. Ma Qi besieged Labrang numerous times and the Tibetans and Mongols fought against his Muslim forces for control of Labrang, until he gave it up in 1927.

Ma Qi defeated the Tibetan forces with his Muslim troops. His forces were praised by foreigners who traveled through Qinghai for their fighting abilities.

After the founding of the Republic he was governor of Qinghai from 1915 to 1928 and the first chairman of the government of Qinghai from 1929 to 1931. After Chiang Kai-shek gained control nationwide, he became a brigade commander and then was promoted to commander of the 26th Division of the National Revolutionary Army in the northwestern region. His civil posts also included director of the Gansu Bureau of Construction. Ma Qi's eldest son was Ma Buqing and another son was Ma Bufang. Ma Qi was the uncle of Ma Zhongying. He died on 5 August 1931 in Xining, Qinghai, China.

== See also ==
- Ma clique
