= Ma Lin (warlord) =

Chinese general and politician (1873–1945)

- 馬麟
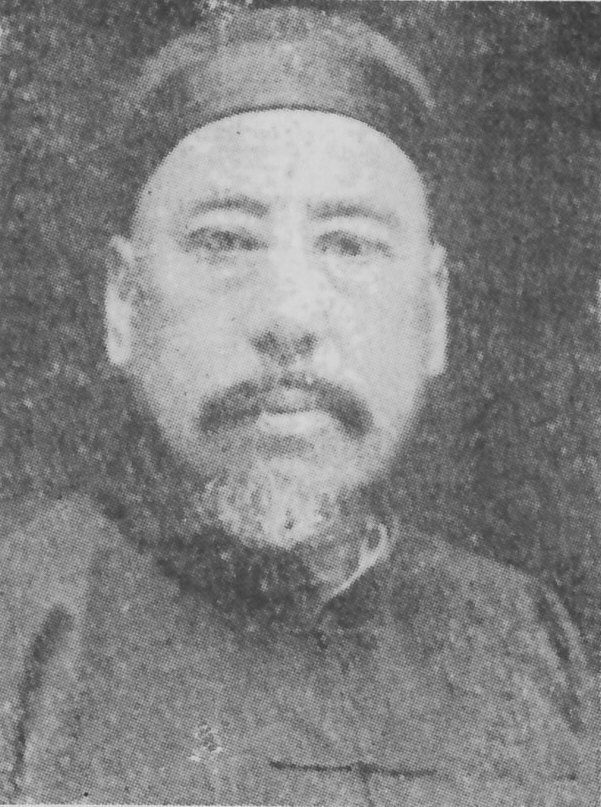
- General Ma Lin

Governor of Qinghai
- In office May 1931 – 5 March 1938
- Preceded by: Ma Qi
- Succeeded by: Ma Bufang

Personal details
- Born: 1873 Linxia County, Gansu
- Died: 26 January 1945 (aged 71–72) Qinghai
- Party: Kuomintang

Military service
- Allegiance: Qing Dynasty; China
- Years of service: 1890s–1945
- Battles/wars: Boxer Rebellion, Muslim conflict in Gansu (1927-30), Sino-Tibetan War

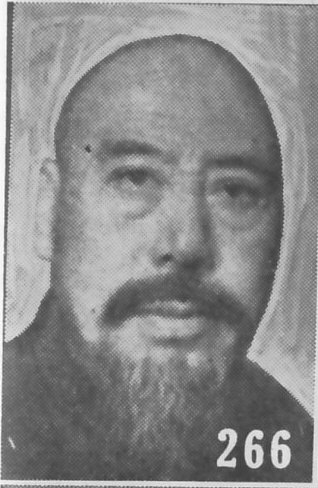
Ma Lin (date unknown)

Ma Lin (Xiao'erjing: مَا لٍ, simplified Chinese: 马麟; traditional Chinese: 馬麟; pinyin: Mǎ Lín; Wade–Giles: Ma Lin; 1873 – 26 January 1945) was the governor of Qinghai 1931–38 and the brother of Ma Qi. A Hui Muslim born in 1873, Linxia County, Gansu, he mainly acceded to the posts of his brother, being general of southeastern Gansu province, as well as councillor of the Qinghai provincial government and acting head of the Construction Bureau of Qinghai province. His father was Ma Haiyan.

== Career ==
Ma Lin's father Ma Haiyan fought in the Boxer Rebellion at the Battle of Langfang and died of natural causes in 1900.

Ma Lin assisted the Xidaotang in filing a lawsuit against Ma Anliang after his death in 1919, to gain recognition for them as a legitimate Muslim sect.

His great-nephew Ma Zhongying seized the city of Hezhou in the 1920s in a battle during the Muslim conflict in Gansu (1927–1930), and vanquished Ma Lin's army, which was sent to retake the city. Ma Lin defeated Ma Ting-hsiang (Ma Tingxiang).

Ma Lin succeeded his brother Ma Qi as Governor of Qinghai following his death in 1931, but real military power remained in the hands of his nephew, Gen. Ma Bufang, who succeeded his father Ma Qi as military commander.

In 1932, during his administration of Qinghai, the Sino–Tibetan War broke out. Ma Lin's personal representative was Chao Pei-lei.

Ma Lin held the position of Civil Governor, while Ma Bufang was Military Governor. They feuded with and disliked each other. People did not admire Ma Bufang as much as his uncle Ma Lin, who was adored by the people. Ma Lin worked in the governor's yamen during his reign. His secretary was named Feng.

In autumn of 1936 Ma Bufang made his move to expel his uncle from power and replace him. Ma Bufang made his position unstable and unbearable until Ma Lin resigned from power by making the Hajj to Mecca. Ma Lin's next position was to be part of the National Government Committee. In an interview he was described as having "high admiration and unwavering loyalty to Chiang Kai-shek", and was interested in the progress of the Anti-Japanese war.

He was reported to be pious and his family mosque was in good shape. The new Yihewani (Ikhwan) sect was patronized and backed by Ma Lin and Ma Bufang to help modernize society, education, and reform old traditions.

In 1942 Ma Lin was serving on the 36-seat State Council; the only other Muslim member was the Uyghur Masud Sabri.

He went on a Hajj to Mecca. Approximately 123 persons accompanied him, including the Imams Ma Debao and Ma Zhengqing, who brought Salafi/Wahhabism ideology back to China, which the Yihewani Imams promptly rejected as heretical. Ma Lin's nephew, Ma Bufang, the governor of Qinghai, persecuted the new Salafi Wahhabis.

He died on 26 January 1945.

Ma Lin's eldest son Ma Burong (Ma Pu-jung) 馬步榮 defected to the Communists after 1949 and donated 10,000 Yuan to support Chinese troops in the Korean War. He had another son, Ma Buyuan (Ma Pu-yüan) 馬步援.

== See also ==
- Ma clique
- People's Army
