= Ma Bufang =

Chinese warlord (1903–1975)

- 馬步芳
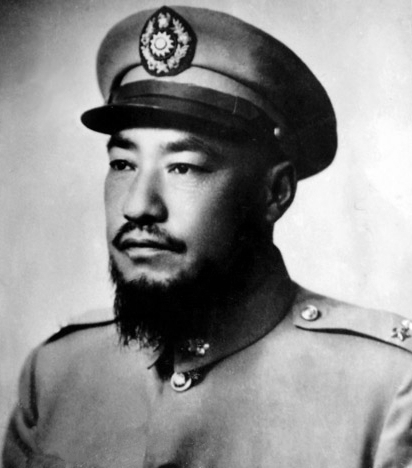
- Lieutenant General Ma Bufang

1st Ambassador of the Republic of China to Saudi Arabia
- In office 9 August 1957 – 3 June 1961
- President: Chiang Kai-shek
- Preceded by: Diplomatic relations established
- Succeeded by: Bao Junjian

Governor of Qinghai
- In office 5 March 1938 – 5 September 1949
- Preceded by: Ma Lin
- Succeeded by: Zhao Shoushan

Personal details
- Born: 1903 Linxia County, Gansu, Qing Empire
- Died: 31 July 1975 (aged 71–72) Jeddah, Saudi Arabia
- Party: Kuomintang
- Spouse: Ma Suqin
- Children: Ma Jiyuan
- Education: Officers' Training Corps of Qinghai
- Awards: Order of the Sacred Tripod
- Nickname: King of Qinghai

Military service
- Allegiance: Republic of China
- Years of service: 1928–1949
- Rank: General
- Unit: Ninghai Army
- Commands: Chairman of Qinghai Province, Commander-in-Chief of 40th Army Group
- Battles/wars: Sino-Tibetan War, Long March, Second Sino-Japanese War, Chinese Civil War, Ili Rebellion, Kuomintang Pacification of Qinghai, Western Expedition (1936)

Ma Bufang (traditional Chinese: 馬步芳; simplified Chinese: 马步芳; pinyin: Mǎ Bùfāng; Wade–Giles: Ma^{³} Pu^{⁴}-fang^{¹}; Xiao'erjing: مَا بُ‌فَانْ; 1903 – 31 July 1975) was a prominent Chinese Muslim Ma clique warlord in China during the Republican era, ruling the province of Qinghai. His rank was lieutenant-general.

== Life ==
Ma Bufang and his older brother Ma Buqing (1901–1977) were born in Monigou Township (漠泥沟乡) in what is today Linxia County, 35 kilometres (22 mi) west of Linxia City. Their father Ma Qi (马麒) formed the Ninghai Army in Qinghai in 1915, and received civilian and military posts from the Beiyang Government in Beijing confirming his military and civilian authority there.

His older brother Ma Buqing received a classical Chinese education, while Ma Bufang received education in Islam. Ma Qi originally had Ma Bufang study to become an imam while his older brother Ma Buqing was educated in the military. Ma Bufang studied until he was nineteen and then pursued a military career like his brother. Ma Bufang controlled the Great Dongguan Mosque. Ma was a graduate of the Officers' Training Corps of Qinghai.

Ma Bufang sided with Feng Yuxiang's Guominjun until the Central Plains War, when he switched to the winning side of Chiang Kai-shek. Ma Qi died in 1931 and his power was assumed by his brother Ma Lin (马麟), who was appointed governor of Qinghai.

=== Ascension to Governorship ===
General Ma Lin held the position of civil Governor, while Ma Bufang was military Governor. They feuded with, and disliked each other. Ma Bufang was not admired by people as much as his uncle Ma Lin, whom the people adored.

In 1936, under the order of Chiang Kai-shek, and with the help of Ma Zhongying's remnant force in Gansu, and Ma Hongkui's and Ma Hongbin's force from Ningxia, Ma Bufang and his brother Ma Buqing played an important role in annihilating Zhang Guotao's 21,800 strong force that crossed the Yellow River in an attempt to expand the Communist base. In 1937, Ma Bufang rose with the help of the Kuomintang and forced his uncle Ma Lin to concede his position. At that point Ma Bufang became governor of Qinghai, with military and civilian powers, and remained in that position until the Communist victory in 1949. During Ma Bufang's rise to power, he along with Ma Buqing and cousins Ma Hongkui and Ma Hongbin, were instrumental in helping another cousin, Ma Zhongying, to prevail in Gansu. They did not want Ma Zhongying to compete with them on their own turf, so they encouraged and supported Ma Zhongying in developing his own power base in other regions such as Gansu and Xinjiang. Ma Bufang defeated Ma Zhongying in a battle in Gansu, and drove him into Xinjiang.

In 1936, Ma Bufang was appointed commander of the newly organized 2nd army.

Because Ma Bufang did not want the 14th Dalai Lama to succeed his predecessor, he stationed his men in such a way that the Dalai Lama was effectively under house arrest, saying this was needed for "protection", and refusing to permit him to leave for Tibet. He did all he could to delay the movement of the Dalai Lama from Qinghai to Tibet by demanding 100,000 Chinese silver dollars.

Even though his uncle Ma Lin was officially governor of Qinghai, Ma Bufang held de facto military power in the province and foreigners acknowledged this. While his uncle Ma Lin was governor of Qinghai, Ma Bufang was pacification commissioner of Gansu. In 1936, during Autumn, Ma Bufang made his move to expel his uncle from power and to replace him. Ma Bufang made Ma Lin's position untenable and unbearable until he resigned from power by making the Hajj to Mecca. Ma Lin's next position was to be part of the National Government Committee. In an interview Ma Lin was described as having: "high admiration and unwavering loyalty to Chiang Kai-shek".

The Qing dynasty had granted his family a yellow standard which had his family name "Ma" on it. Ma Bufang continued to use this standard in battle and, as of 1936, he had 30,000 Muslim cavalrymen in his army.

== War against Tibet and Ngoloks ==
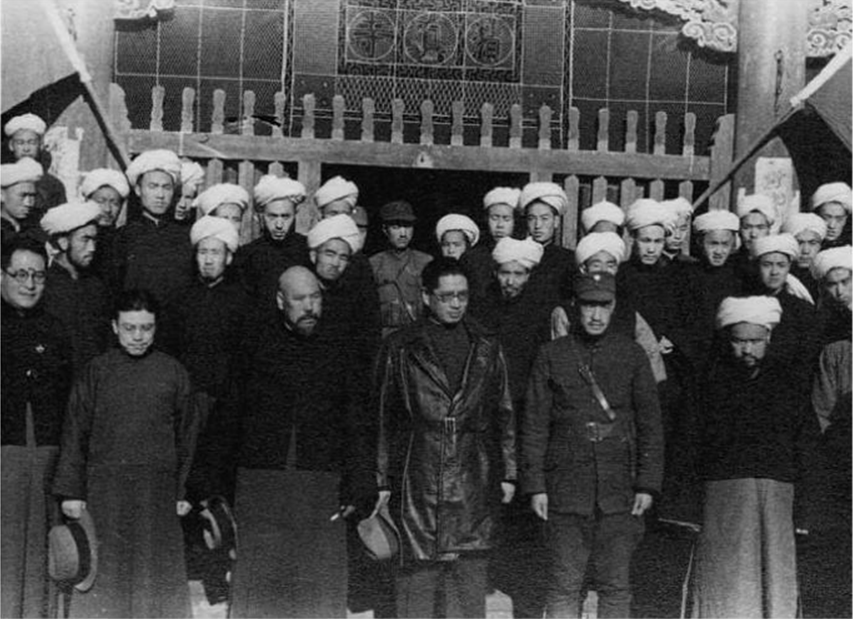
T. V. Soong and Ma Bufang of the Republic of China visit a mosque in Xining, Qinghai in 1934

Ma Bufang had a conflicted relationship with the Tibetan population of Qinghai. Some Tibetan Buddhists served in his army while others were crushed and killed by it.

In 1932, Ma Bufang's Muslim troops, and the Han Chinese general Liu Wenhui, defeated the 13th Dalai Lama's Tibetan armies when Tibet tried to invade Qinghai province. Ma Bufang overran the Tibetan armies and recaptured several counties in Xikang province. Shiqu, Dengke, and other counties were seized from the Tibetans who were pushed back to the other side of the Jinsha River. Ma and Liu warned Tibetan officials not to cross the Jinsha River again. A truce was signed ending the fighting.

The reputation of the Muslim forces of Ma Bufang was boosted by the war and victory against the Tibetan army. The stature of Ma Biao rose over his role in the war and later in 1937 his battles against the Japanese propelled him to fame nationwide in China. The control of China over the border area of Kham and Yushu with Tibet was guarded by the Qinghai army. Chinese Muslim run schools used their victory in the war against Tibet to show how they defended the integrity of China's territory as it was put in danger since the Japanese invasion.

The Kuomintang Republic of China government supported Ma Bufang when he launched seven extermination expeditions into Golog, eliminating thousands of Ngolok tribesmen. Some Tibetans counted the number of times he attacked, remembering the seventh attack which made life impossible for them. Ma was highly anti-communist, and he and his army wiped out many Ngolok tribal Tibetans in the northeast and eastern Qinghai, and also destroyed Tibetan Buddhist Temples.

Ma Bufang established the Kunlun Middle School and used it to recruit Tibetan students, who were subjected to harsh military life. The school became an important source of Tibetan translators as Ma expanded his military domain over land inhabited by Tibetans. As Ma Bufang defeated more Tibetans, he also drafted them into his army.

Ma Bufang attacked and demolished a Tibetan Buddhist monastery in Rebgong in 1939, one of the oldest in Amdo. Ma Bufang sent his army to destroy and loot the Tsanggar Monastery in 1941; his forces expelled the monks. It was not until the Communists took power that the Monastery could be rebuilt; the monks returned in 1953. Many of the monasteries attacked by Ma Bufang were associated with the Ngoloks.

Tibetan tribals in southern Qinghai revolted due to taxation between 1939 and 1941, but they were crushed by "suppression campaigns" and massacred by Ma Bufang which caused a major influx of Tibetan refugees into Tibet from Qinghai.

A former Tibetan Khampa soldier named Aten, who battled Ma Bufang's forces, provided an account of a battle. He described the Chinese Muslims as "fierce". After he and his troops were ambushed by 2,000 of Ma Bufang's Chinese Muslim cavalry, he was left with bullet wounds and he "had no illusions as to the fate of most of our group", most of whom were wiped out. Aten also asserted that "the Tibetan province of Amdo", was "occupied" by Ma Bufang.

== Second Sino-Japanese War ==
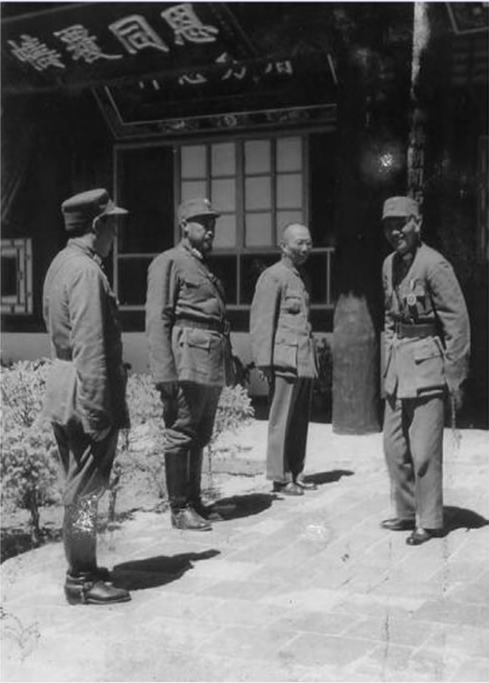
Chiang Kai-shek (right) meets with the Muslim Generals Ma Bufang (second from left), and Ma Buqing (first from left) in Xining in August 1942.

Ma Bufang called for peace and tolerance between ethnicities.

The soldiers in Ma Bufang's cavalry forces belonged to a wide range of ethnicities. Hui, Mongols, Tibetans, and Han Chinese all served in Ma Bufang's cavalry. Ma Bufang's ethnic tolerance in theory ensured that recruits could escape ethnic divergence in his armies.

In 1937 and 1938, the Japanese attempted to approach Ma Bufang and were ignored.

Ma Bufang's soldiers were designated as the 82nd Army during the war against Japan.

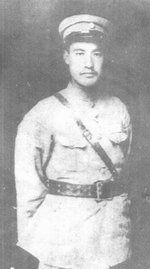
Ma Bufang- date unknown

In 1937, when the Japanese attack at the Battle of Beiping–Tianjin began the Chinese government was notified by Muslim General Ma Bufang of the Ma clique that he was prepared to bring the fight to the Japanese in a telegram message. Immediately after the Marco Polo Bridge Incident, he arranged for a cavalry division, under Muslim General Ma Biao, to be sent east to battle the Japanese. Ma Buqing and Ma Bufang discussed the battle plans against the Japanese over the telephone with Chiang Kai-shek. The top crack elite cavalry of Ma Bufang was sent against Japan. Ethnic Turkic Salar Muslims made up the majority of the first cavalry division which Ma Bufang sent.

Because of fierce resistance by Ma Hongkui and Ma Bufang's Muslim cavalry, the Japanese were never able to reach and capture Lanzhou during the war. Ma Bufang also obstructed Japanese agents trying to contact the Tibetans and was called an "adversary" by a Japanese agent.

Ma became governor of Qinghai when he expelled his uncle Ma Lin from power in 1938. He commanded a group army. He was appointed because of his anti-Japanese inclinations.

Under orders from the Kuomintang government of Chiang Kaishek, Ma Bufang repaired Yushu Batang Airport to prevent Tibetan separatists from seeking independence. Chiang also ordered Ma Bufang to put his Muslim soldiers on alert for an invasion of Tibet in 1942. Ma Bufang complied, and moved several thousand troops to the border with Tibet. Chiang also threatened the Tibetans with bombing if they did not comply. Ma Bufang attacked the Tibetan Buddhist Tsang monastery in 1941. He also constantly attacked the Labrang Monastery.

Ma Bufang's army battled extensively in bloody battles against the Japanese in Henan province. Ma Bufang sent his army, under the command of his relative General Ma Biao, to fight the Japanese in Henan. The Qinghai Chinese, Salar, Chinese Muslim, Dongxiang, and Tibetan troops Ma Bufang sent fought to the death against the Imperial Japanese Army, or committed suicide refusing to be taken prisoner, when cornered by the enemy. When they defeated the Japanese, the Muslim troops slaughtered all of them except for a few prisoners sent back to Qinghai to prove that they had been victorious. In September 1940, when the Japanese launched an offensive against the Muslim Qinghai troops, the Muslims ambushed them and killed so many of them that they were forced to retreat. The Japanese could not even pick up their dead; instead, they cut an arm from their corpses for cremation to send back to Japan. The Japanese did not attempt to make a similar offensive again. Ma Biao was the eldest son of Ma Haiqing, who was the sixth younger brother of Ma Haiyan, Ma Bufang's grandfather.

During the war against Japan, Ma Bufang commanded the 82nd Army.

Xining was subjected to aerial bombardment by Japanese warplanes in 1941 during the Second-Sino Japanese War. The bombing spurred all ethnicities in Qinghai, including the local Qinghai Mongols and Qinghai Tibetans, against the Japanese. The Salar Muslim General Han Youwen directed the defense of the city of Xining during air raids by Japanese planes. Han survived an aerial bombardment by Japanese planes in Xining while he was being directed via telephone from Ma Bufang, who hid in an air raid shelter in a military barracks. The bombing resulted in human flesh splattering a Blue Sky with a White Sun flag and Han being buried in rubble. Han Youwen was dragged out of the rubble while bleeding and he managed to grab a machine gun while he was limping and fired back at the Japanese warplanes and cursed the Japanese as dogs in his native Salar language.

Ma Bukang and Ma Bufang were having a discussion on Ma Biao when Japanese warplanes bombed Xining.

In 1942, Generalissimo Chiang Kai-shek, head of the Chinese government, toured Northwestern China in Xinjiang, Gansu, Ningxia, Shaanxi, and Qinghai, where he met both Ma Buqing and Ma Bufang. It was reported around this time that Ma had 50,000 elite soldiers in his army.

Ma Bufang supported the Chinese nationalist imam Hu Songshan.

== Chinese Civil War ==
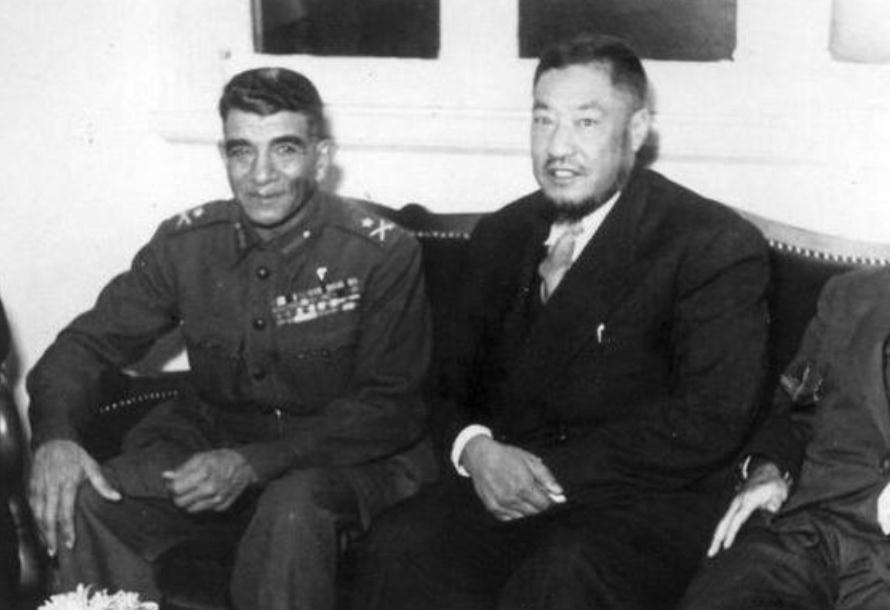
Egyptian President Muhammad Naguib with General Ma Bufang.

Ma Bufang was elected to the Sixth Central Committee of the Kuomintang in 1945.

The Kuomintang Chinese government ordered Ma Bufang to march his troops into Xinjiang several times to intimidate the pro-Soviet Governor Sheng Shicai. This helped to provide protection for Chinese settling in Xinjiang. Ma Bufang was sent with his Muslim Cavalry to Urumqi by the Kuomintang in 1945 during the Ili Rebellion to protect it from the Uyghur army from Hi.

Ma Bufang relocated Genghis Khan's shrine from Yulin to Xining in 1949. On April 7, 1949, Ma Bufang and Ma Hongkui announced jointly that they would continue to fight the Communists, and would not make an accord with them. Fighting continued as the Communists advanced. Ma was made Chief of all Military and Political affairs of the Northwest by the Kuomintang.

The Panchen Lama, who was exiled from Tibet by the Dalai Lama's government, wanted to seek revenge by leading an army against Tibet in September 1949 and asked for help from Ma Bufang. Ma Bufang patronized the Panchen Lama, and the Lamaist Red Sect against the Dalai Lama. Qinghai served as a "sanctuary" for Red Sect members; Ma Bufang allowed Kumbum Monastery to be totally self-governed by the Panchen Lama.

General Ma Bufang was appointed Supreme Commander in Chief of the entire region of northwestern China by the government, described by TIME magazine as "13 times as big as Texas", containing "14 million people" "one-third Han Chinese, one-third Muslim Chinese, and the remainder Tibetans, Turkis, Mongolians, Kazaks". He entered Lanzhou in a Buick with his troops, seizing buildings and setting up camps. Ma Bufang also had to battle against forty Soviet warplanes sent by Joseph Stalin against his forces.

Generals Hu Zongnan and Ma Bufang led five corps to defeat General Peng's army near Baoji. They killed 15,000 members of the People's Liberation Army (PLA).

In August 1949, Ma Bufang traveled by plane to the Kuomintang (KMT) government in Canton to request supplies via airdrop, while his son Ma Jiyuan assumed command over the KMT forces at Lanzhou who advised journalists they would defend the city. However, the government denied his request, and Ma flew back to Lanzhou, then abandoned it, retreating by truck back to Xining. Then the Chinese Communist People's Liberation Army, led by General Peng Dehuai, defeated Ma's army and occupied Lanzhou, the capital of Gansu. Ma was driven out of Xining and escaped to Chongqing then Hong Kong. He had 50,000 dollars in money with him. While residing in a flat in Hong Kong, he stated his intention to flee to Mecca. In October, Chiang Kai-shek urged him to return to the Northwest to resist the PLA, but he fled to Mecca with more than 200 relatives and subordinates, in the name of hajj.

Ma Bufang, and his family members like son Ma Jiyuan, cousin Ma Bukang, and nephew Ma Chengxiang, fled to Saudi Arabia; however, after one year, Ma Bufang and Ma Bukang then moved to Cairo, Egypt, while his son Ma Jiyuan, with ten Generals, moved to Taiwan.

General Ma Bufang announced the start of the Kuomintang Islamic Insurgency in China (1950–1958), on January 9, 1950, when he was in Cairo, Egypt saying that Chinese Muslims would never surrender to Communism and would fight a guerilla war against the Communists. His former military forces, most of them Muslim, continued to play a major role in the insurgency.

In 1950, Ma moved to Cairo. He was there to request help from Arab countries. Ma served as representative of the Kuomintang to Egypt.

== Ambassador to Saudi Arabia ==
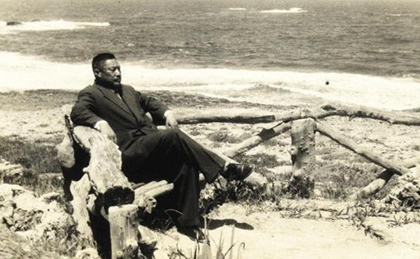
Ma Bufang in Egypt 1955

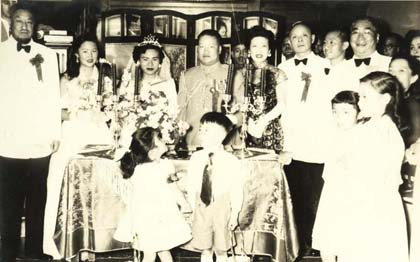
Ma Bufang with the Kuomintang ambassador to Saudi Arabia in 1955.

In 1957, after the establishment of diplomatic relations between Egypt and the People's Republic of China, Ma was transferred by Taipei to serve as the ROC ambassador to Saudi Arabia. Ma served in this post for four years; he never returned to Taiwan. He was in the post from 1957 to 1961 until his dismissal "on charges of corruption and incompetence". He received Saudi citizenship and remained in Saudi Arabia until his death in 1975 at the age of 72. He had one son, Ma Jiyuan (馬繼援), who served as a divisional commander in Ma Bufang's army.

=== Position on East Turkestan Independence ===
While serving as ambassador, in response to a request by Abdul Ahad Hamed, a former Uyghur Mufti living in Saudi Arabia, for accommodations to be granted to Uyghurs who held Republic of China passports, living outside China, Ma Bufang sent the following letter which rejected this request and rejected his usage of the term "East Turkestan", upheld the official position of the Republic of China that Xinjiang was a part of China and that it did not recognize the East Turkestan Independence Movement.

Dear Brother,
With all due respect to your previous position in the Government of Sinkiang and to the confidence placed in you by His Excellency the President of the Republic of China, I hope that you will refrain from using expressions which should not be used by one who occupied the position of a mufti. We are all serving our beloved country trying to do our best for our countrymen. I also hope that you will refrain from using the expression "The Turkestani Nation" which was the creation of one Abdul Qayyum Khan while he was living in Germany. We are working for the welfare of the true people of Sinkiang not for the Turkestanis living outside Sinkiang or the followers of Abdul Qayyum Khan.
Best regards,

Ambassador of Nationalist China in Saudi Arabia

== Mansion ==
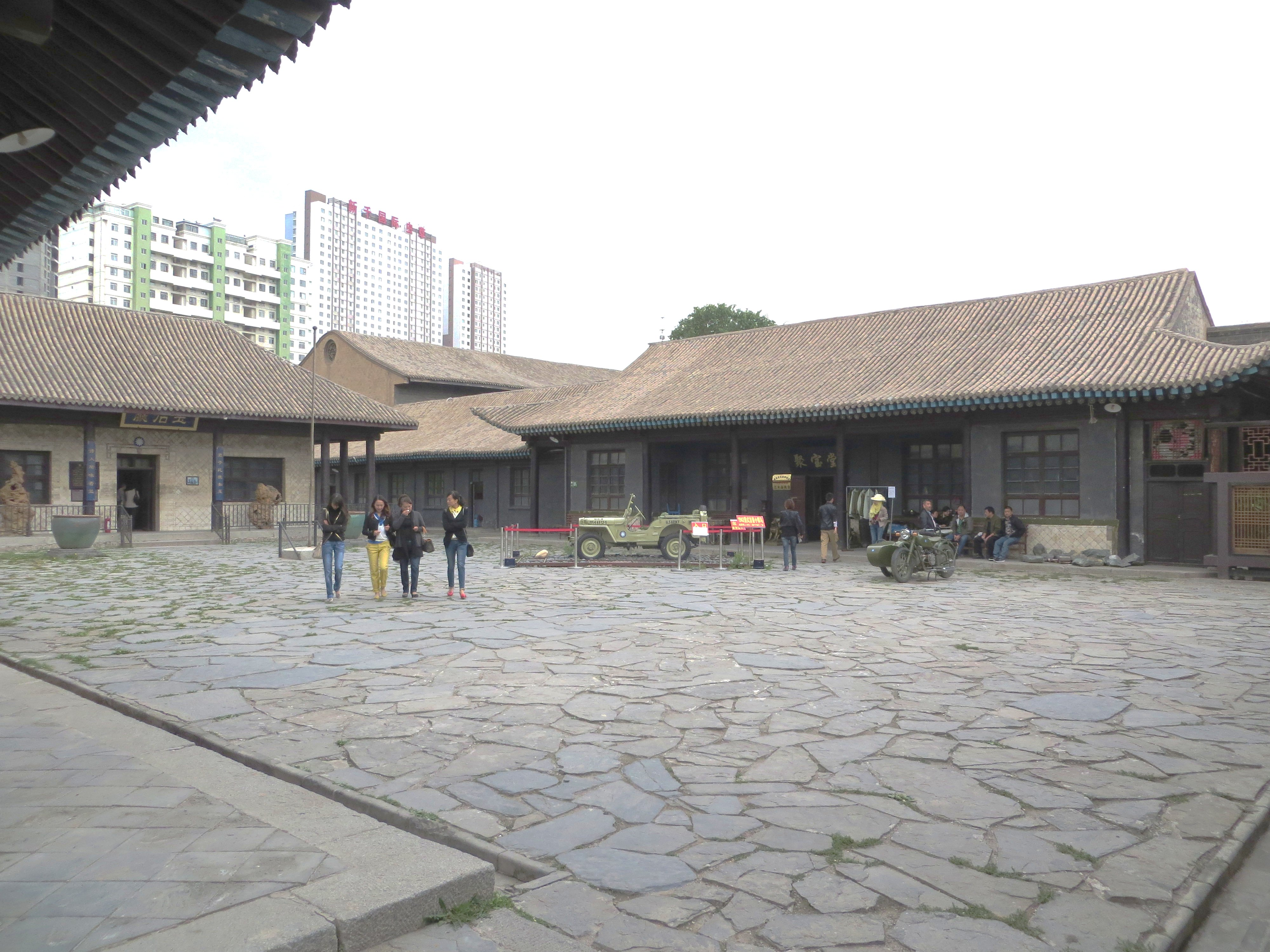
Ma Bufang Mansion in Xining, Qinghai Province, People's Republic of China

The Ma Bufang Mansion in Xining, Qinghai was where Ma and his family lived from 1943 to 1949. In 1938 Ma Bufang built a residence for his concubine called East mansion. Ma Bufang's headquarters was converted into the provincial museum by the Communists, until a new one was built. It currently contains the "Qinghai Cultural Relics and Archaeology Institute" collection.

== Former officers ==
Ma Bufang's former chief of staff was Ma Wending, who defected to the communists and became vice-chairman of the Standing Committee of the Qinghai Provincial People's Congress.

Another officer who served under Ma Bufang, the Salar General Han Youwen, also defected to the Communists and joined the People's Liberation Army.

Ma Bufang had another chief of staff in his North-West Command, Ma Ji. Ma Ji's son Ma Wenying later became a well known tailor.

== Policies ==
=== Military ===
Ma Bufang recruited many Salar officers, such as Han Yimu and General Han Youwen into his army; most came from Xunhua County.

Ma Bufang's regime centered on the support of "fanatically disciplined and obedient Chinese Muslims". After he took over as Governor, he turned to civilian governing. His son was handed Ma Bufang's former role as authority over the army.

=== Nationalism ===
Ma Bufang presented himself as a Chinese nationalist and someone who fought against Western imperialism to the people of China in order to deflect criticism by opponents that his government was feudal and oppressed minorities like Tibetans and Buddhist Mongols. He presented himself as a Chinese nationalist to his advantage to keep himself in power as noted by the author Erden. The Kuomintang party was officially anti-feudal, and the Kuomintang itself claimed to be a revolutionary party of the people, so being accused of feudalism was a serious insult. Chiang Kai-shek, leader of the Kuomintang, spoke out publicly against feudalism and feudal warlords. Ma Bufang was forced to defend himself against the accusations, and stated to the news media that his army was a part of the "National army, people's power".

=== Industrialization ===
Ma Bufang was described as a socialist by American journalist John Roderick and "friendly" compared to the other Ma Clique warlords. Ma Bufang was reported to be good humoured and jovial in contrast to the brutal reign of Ma Hongkui.

Most of eastern China was ravaged by the Second Sino-Japanese War. In contrast, during the Chinese Civil war Qinghai was relatively untouched.

An American scholar, A. Doak Barnett, praised Ma Bufang's government as: "one of the most efficient in China, and one of the most energetic. While most of China is bogged down, almost inevitably, by Civil War, Qinghai is attempting to carry out small-scale, but nevertheless ambitious, development and reconstruction schemes on its own initiative".

General Ma started a state run and controlled industrialization project, directly creating educational, medical, agricultural, and sanitation projects, run or assisted by the state. The state provided money for food and uniforms in all schools, state run or private. Roads and a theater were constructed. The state controlled the press; no freedom was allowed for independent journalists. His regime was dictatorial in its political system. Barnett admitted that the regime had "sterm authoritarianism" and "little room for personal freedom".

In 1947 the United States sold Ma Bufang a piped water (sewage) system which was installed in Xining.

Like all the other Kuomintang members, Ma Bufang was anti-Communist.

Ma was regarded as a "modernizer" and "reformer" during his rule over Qinghai.

=== Environment and infrastructure ===
Ma enforced a strict reforestation program to help the environment. Villagers were required to meet a quota for tree planting after being supplied with saplings and instructions; cutting down a tree without permission led to execution. Millions of trees were planted in Qinghai during his rule, and he built an irrigation system in addition to roads. Around 1.5 million people lived in Qinghai under Ma Bufang. He was obsessed with preventing soil erosion and tree planting, saying: "The salvation of our desert was in the tree". He had "education teams" teach the entire population about the role of trees in protecting the environment.

=== Education and women's rights ===
Ma Bufang also promoted education. He made businessmen methodically clean up Xining, the capital of Qinghai, by serving as insect exterminators, killing flies, and neatly disposing of them.

Ma Bufang and his wife built a school for Muslim girls in Linxia which provided a modern secular education.

=== Patron of the arts ===
Ma Bufang sent the Chinese artist Zhang Daqian to Sku'bum to seek helpers to analyze and copy Dunhuang Buddhist art. Ma Bufang patronized the folk songwriter Wang Luobin, who wrote the famous folk song "In That Place Wholly Faraway" in Qinghai while shooting a film at Ma's invitation. Ma Bufang later rescued Wang Luobin from prison and employed him on his staff. Wang composed the "War Horse Song" for the cavalry division Ma Bufang sent to fight the Japanese invaders as well as the "March of the Chinese Muslims".

=== Treatment of minorities ===
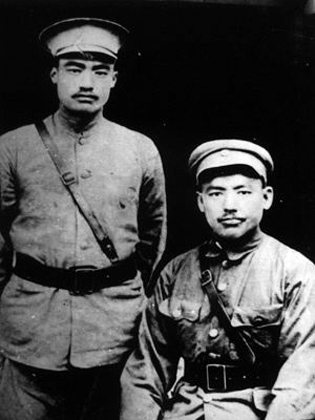
Republic of China Chinese Muslim Generals Ma Bufang (left) and his brother Ma Buqing (right). Both members of the Kuomintang.

Author Kevin Stuart claimed that the Mongour were reported to have been abused by KMT officials under Ma Bufang.

Ma cooperated with the Panchen Lama against the Dalai Lama's regime in Tibet. The Panchen Lama stayed in Qinghai. Ma tried to persuade him to come with the Kuomintang government to Taiwan when the Communist victory was imminent, but the Panchen Lama decided to defect to the Communists instead. The Panchen Lama, unlike the Dalai Lama, sought to exert control in decision making. In addition, the Kuomintang expanded into the Lhasa regime of the Dalai Lama.

Closer to the Communist takeover, Ma Bufang tried to rally Tibetan and Mongol militia at Kokonuur Lake. A Mongol official, Wang Benba, derailed the attempt, urging them not to fight, saying that Communist victory was inevitable.

==== Tibetans ====
Tibetan independence groups allege and accuse Ma Bufang of carrying out Sinicization policies in Tibetan areas: he is said to have forced Tibetans to intermarry, and to change their religious beliefs. He also spread and popularized holidays such as the Chinese New Year.

Since Qinghai (Amdo) was under Ma's rule, the 14th Dalai Lama and his family spoke Chinese as their native language, not knowing Tibetan until 1939 when they relocated their home to Lhasa.

Ma Bufang eliminated slavery and lordship among the Mongols and Tibetans. From the book The Mongols at China's Edge: History and the Politics of National Unity, the author, Uradyn Erden Bulag wrote: "In the past, the Mongols and Tibetans were divided as lords and slaves, but the two Chairmen [Ma Qi and Ma Bufang], insisting on the principle of equality of all nationalities in our country, corrected the absurdity and astutely reformed it."

Near the Tibetan village of Skya Rgya in Qinghai, Muslims live around the Yellow river in the town of Dong sna 20 kilometers away and they are registered by the Chinese government as Hui. The elderly "Hui" in this village speak imperfect Chinese but speak perfect Tibetan and trade frequently with the Tibetans, saying they were originally Tibetans. One of them, a man born in 1931 said "We have the same blood; we have the same ancestors. We used to marry each other, shared the same customs and observed the same traditional principles. It was Ma Bufang who converted us to Islam."

==== Religion ====
The new Yihewani (Ikhwan) sect was patronized and backed by Ma Lin and Ma Bufang to help modernize society, education, and reform old traditions. Ma Bufang kept religious affairs and clerics separate from state and civil affairs; religion was only concerned with education, morality, and other non-administrative matters.

The Yihewani sect was modernist, identifying strongly with Chinese culture and politics, whereas the Salafi Muslims stressed a non-political, and, what they termed an "original" form of Islam. In 1937, when the Salafi formally split with the Yihewani Muslim Brotherhood, Ma Bufang persecuted them as "heterodox" and "foreign". The Salafis were not allowed to move or to worship openly. General Ma effectively suppressed all non-Yihewani groups, including the traditional Sunni Gedimu, the oldest sect of Islam in China, by enforcing Yihewani Imams on them. However, when the Communist party took over, the Gedimu used the Communist party's rules on freedom of religion to ward off the Yihewani practices and imams.

In contrast to his treatment of Salafis, General Ma allowed polytheists to worship openly, and Christian missionaries to station themselves in Qinghai. General Ma, and other high-ranking Muslim Generals, even attended the Kokonuur Lake Ceremony where the God of the Lake was worshipped. During the ritual, the Chinese national anthem was sung. Participants bowed to a portrait of Kuomintang Party founder Dr. Sun Zhongshan, and to the God of the Lake, and offerings were given to him by the participants, which included Muslims. Ma Bufang invited Kazakh Muslims to attend the ceremony honoring the God. He received audiences of Christian missionaries, who sometimes gave him the Gospel. His son Ma Jiyuan received a silver cup from Christian missionaries.

== Career ==
- 1928 General Officer Commanding 9th New Division
- 1932 General Officer Commanding II New Corps
- 1938–1949 Military-Governor of Qinghai Province
- 1938–1941 General Officer Commanding LXXXII Corps
- 1943–1945 Commander in Chief 40th Army Group

He commanded the New 9th Division, New 2nd Army, and the 82nd Army. Another one of his positions was vice-commander of the 77th Brigade of the 26th Division.

Political offices
Preceded by Ma Lin	Governor of Qinghai; 1938–1949	Succeeded by Zhao Shoushan
Diplomatic posts
New office	Ambassador of the Republic of China to Saudi Arabia; 1957–1961	Succeeded by Bao Junjian
