= Golok people =

Ethnic group in China

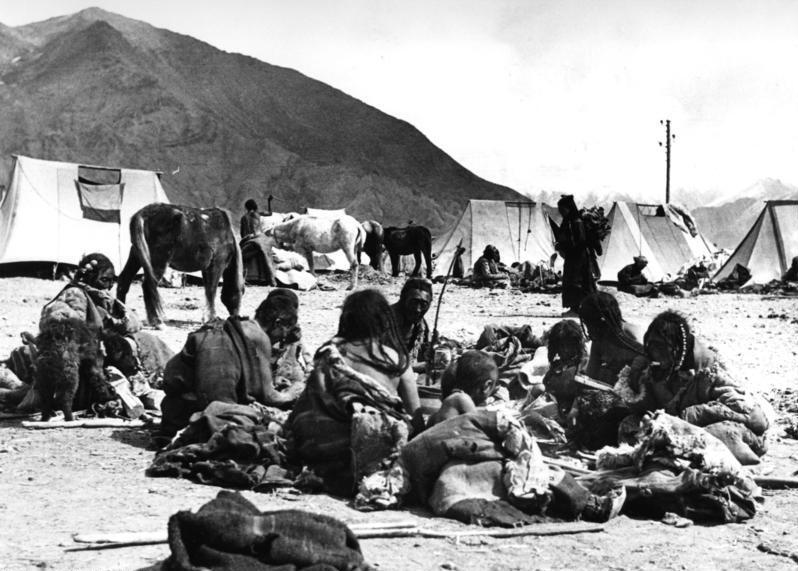
Golok camp (photo taken at the 1938–1939 German expedition to Tibet)

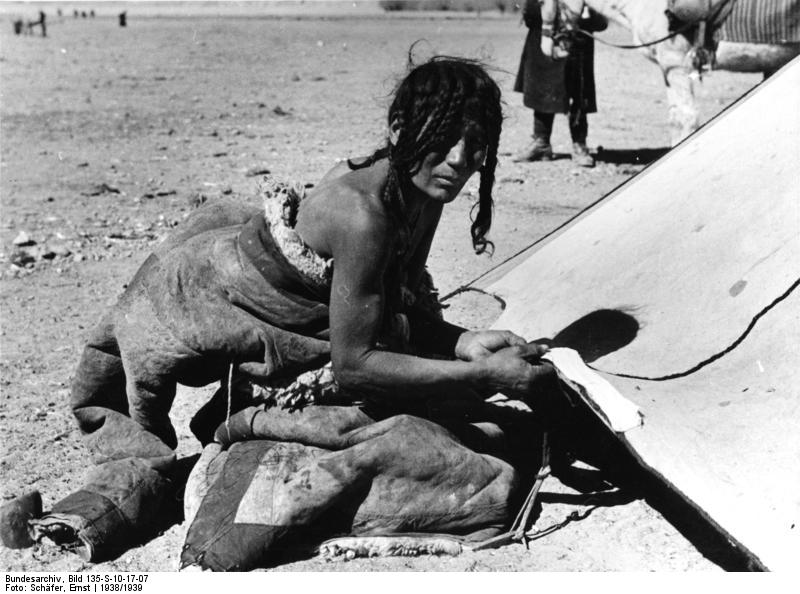
A Golok nomad in Lhasa

The Golok (Tibetan: མགོ་ལོག; Chinese: 果洛) peoples live in Golog Tibetan Autonomous Prefecture, Qinghai, China around the upper reaches of the Yellow River (Wylie: dmar chu) and the sacred mountain Amne Machin (Wylie: rma rgyal spom ra). The Golok were renowned in both Tibet and China as ferocious fighters free from Tibetan and Chinese control.

The Golok are not an homogeneous group but are composed of peoples of very different geographic origins across the Khams and Amdo region. The Golok was a haven for refugees and immigrants from all over the Amdo and Kham and they are an amalgamation of peoples of diverse origin.

== History ==
The Golok were renowned in both Tibet and China as ferocious fighters free from Tibetan and Chinese control. The name Golok (Wylie: mgo log, ’go log) is sometimes interpreted as meaning "rebellious". A Chinese government document translated Golok as "turned head". Neither Tibet or China was able to subdue them for long. Legends say they were ruled by a Queen, a reincarnated goddess whose power was handed down from mother to daughter.

The Golog sought to remain ungoverned by any polity, not Tibet, not Qing China. A Golog herder was heard saying in 1908, “We Golog have...from time immemorial obeyed none but our own laws,” A folk song recorded in 1951 asserted, “Against the orders of the Dharma King of Tibet I rebel! Against China I rebel! We make our own laws!”

=== Encounter with Tibet ===
In 1828 when the great mystic and poet of early 19th century Amdo, Shabkar Tsokdruk Rangdrol, was returning to Amdo from Central Tibet, his caravan, carrying letters of passage from both the Dalai and Panchen Lamas, was brutally attacked and pillaged by Golok tribesmen. Some months later Shabkar told the Qinghai amban, who was the senior Qing administrator in Xining, what had happened. The amban, admitting that the Golok tribes were beyond Imperial control asked Shabkar to try preaching to them in hopes that this might tame them to some extent.

=== Encounter with China ===
The Chinese had never been able to control the Goloks before, some areas of which owed allegiance to Labrang, but many others which were completely independent. Occasional ambushes killed soldiers of the Ninghai Army, causing loss of dispatches and livestock like yaks. The Hui army, with its modern weaponry, retaliated in draconian fashion and exterminated a group of Goloks, and then convoked the Golok tribes for negotiations, only to slaughter them. A Christian missionary, in writing of the Muslim army's extermination of the Goloks as an act of God, wrote of the events of 1921 in the following way:

During the summer months God again used the Mohammedans of Western Kansu Province to answer more fully the prayers of His people for the last half century for the dark land of Tibet. In the month of April an expedition was launched by them against the wild Goloks, occupying a large territory five or six days to the west and south-west of the field we are at present endeavoring to occupy. One of the chief natural reasons for the incursion was the killing, by the Goloks, of several soldiers carrying official dispatches and seizing four or five thousand yaks belonging to the High Commissioner. The Goloks consisted of three groups and were a most haughty people, considering themselves impregnable, since they had never been subdued by the Chinese in all their history. But the Mohammedans with their up-to-date firearms practically annihilated one group, and the other two hastened to capitulate. It is reported, though that the first and most crushing blow was struck through treachery. The three groups were called together to tender their submission. The Goloks were suddenly attacked and a large number of them were killed. The remainder fled without making any attempt in their weakened condition to avenge their fallen friends. Then followed a chapter of awful bloodshed and cruelty. Men, women, and children were ruthlessly put to the sword and thousands were driven into the Yellow River to perish in its muddy water. A heavy indemnity was exacted, thousands of sheep, yaks, and horses driven away, and tons of wool confiscated. Thus is made safe for travel and missionary work a vast piece of country inhabited by thousands of nomads. We are praising God for the advance step He has enabled us to take.'

After Tibetans attacked the Ninghai Muslim army in 1922 and 1923, the Ninghai army returned in 1924 and crushed the Tibetans, killing numerous Tibetans.

== Distribution ==
Their territory is referred in Tibetan as smar kog. The exact boundaries of the historical territory of Golok do not correspond to the boundaries of the modern prefecture. Historically the region knows as Golog included parts of northern Sichuan, Maqu County in Ganlho Prefecture in Gansu, and other places in the traditional Tibetan regions of Amdo and Khams.
