= Muslim groups in China =

The vast majority of China's Muslims are Sunni Muslims, although a small minority are Shia Muslims.

== Mosques ==
The style of architecture of Hui mosques varies according to their sect. The traditionalist Gedimu Hanafi Sunnis, influenced by Chinese culture, build mosques that look like Chinese temples. The reformist modernist (but originally Wahhabi-inspired) Yihewani build their mosques to look like Middle Eastern Arab-style mosques.

== Hanafi Sunni Gedimu ==
Gedimu (Note: Chinese: 格底目 or 格迪目; Arabic: قديم) or Qadim is the earliest school of Islam in China. It is a Hanafi non-Sufi school of the Sunni tradition. Its supporters are centered on local mosques, which function as relatively independent units. It is numerically the largest Islamic school of thought in China and most common school of Islam among the Hui. Since the introduction of Islam, first during the Tang dynasty in China, it continued to the Ming dynasty with no splits. At the end of the Ming and early Qing dynasty Sufism was introduced to China.

Its members were sometimes extremely hostile to Sufis, Ikhwanis, and Wahhabis, like the Sufi Jahriyya and Yihewani. They engaged in fights and brawls against Sufis and Wahhabis.

== Shafi'i Sunnis ==
Early European explorers speculated that T'ung-kan (Dungans, i.e. Hui, called "Chinese Mohammedan") in Xinjiang originated from Khorezmians who were transported to China by the Mongols, and that they were descended from a mixture of Chinese, Iranians, and Turkic peoples. They also reported that the T'ung-kan were Shafi'ites, which the Khorezmians were also.

== Sufi groups ==
Islamic scholar Ma Tong attempted to calculate Hui membership in Islamic orders and estimated that of the 6,781,500 Hui in China in the late 1980s, 58.2% were Gedimu, 21% Yihewani, 10.9% Jahriyya, 7.2% Khufiyya, 1.4% Qadiriyya, and 0.7% Kubrawiyya. Yang Huaizhong also estimated the proportion of the mosques in Ningxia Hui Autonomous Province and estimated that they were predominantly Sufi. Out of 2132 mosques, he estimated 560 belonged to the Yihewanis, 560 to the Khufiyya, 464 to the Jahriyyas, 415 to the Gedimu and 133 to the Qadiriyya.

=== Sufi Kubrawiyya ===
Kubrawiyya (in Chinese Kuburenye/Kubulinye) was a Sufi sect which is claimed to have arrived in China during the Ming dynasty; evidence shows that they existed since the reign of the Kangxi Emperor of the Qing dynasty. A descendent of Muhammad, Muhuyindeni, went to China, reaching the Dawantou village in Dongxiang around Linxia. The village was entirely composed of Han Chinese surnamed Zhang, all of the same clan. He converted several Zhangs in Yinwa to Islam, to his Sufi menhuan in Dawantou, while in Yangwa the Zhang family people did not convert and continued to practice their traditional Chinese religion. All the Han Zhangs and the Hui Zhangs, being of the same family, celebrated New Year together up to 1949.

=== Sufi Khafiya ===
Ma Laichi established the Hua Si (Note: Chinese: 华寺; "Multicolored Mosque") school (menhuan) – the core of the Khufiyya (خفيه; 虎夫耶) movement in Chinese Islam. The name of the movement – a Chinese form of the Arabic "Khafiyya", i.e. "the silent ones" – refers to its adherents' emphasis on silent dhikr (invocation of God's name). The Khufiyya teachings were characterized by stronger participation in the society, as well as veneration of saints and seeking inspiration at their tombs.

Ma Laichi spent 32 years spreading his teaching among the Muslim Hui and Salar people in Gansu and Qinghai.

The Khuffiya is a Naqshabandi Sufi order.

Khuffiya Sufis were sometimes hostile to the Ikhwan and other Sufis like the Jahriyya and the Xidaotang, engaging in deadly brawls and fights against them. Its members also called the Xidaotang founder, Ma Qixi, an infidel.

=== Sufi Jahriyya ===
Jahriyya (جهرية; 哲赫林耶) is a menhuan (Sufi order) in China. Founded in the 1760s by Ma Mingxin, it has been active in the late 18th and 19th centuries in the then Gansu Province (also including today's Qinghai and Ningxia), when its followers participated in a number of conflicts with other Muslim groups and in several rebellions against the China's ruling Qing dynasty. Its members later cooled down, and many of them like Ma Shaowu became loyal to the Chinese government, crushing other Muslim rebels like the Uyghurs.

The Jahriyya order was founded by the Gansu Chinese-speaking Muslim scholar Ma Mingxin soon after his return to China in 1761, after 16 years of studying in Mecca and Yemen.

Jahriyya is a Naqshbandi (نقشبندية; 納克什班迪) Sufi order.

Its adherents were hostile to the other Sufi order, the Khafiya, engaging in fights. The rivalry was so intense that some members took it personally; Ma Shaowu, a Jahriyya, had a rivalry against Ma Fuxing, a Khafiyya, even though they both worked for the Chinese government.

=== Sufi Qadiriyya ===
Celibacy, poverty, meditation, and mysticism within an ascetic context along with worship centered on Saint's tombs were promoted by the Qadiri Sufi order among Hui Muslims in China. In China, unlike other Muslim sects, the leaders (Shaikhs) of the Qadiriyya Sufi order are celibate. Unlike other Sufi orders in China, the leadership within the order is not a hereditary position, rather, one of the disciples of the celibate Shaikh is chosen by the Shaikh to succeed him. The 92-year-old celibate Shaikh Yang Shijun was the leader of the Qadiriya order in China as of 1998.

== Xidaotang ==
Xidaotang is a Chinese-Islamic school of thought. It was founded by Ma Qixi (1857–1914), a Chinese Muslim from Lintan in Gansu, at the beginning of the 20th century. (Note: Ma Qixi was murdered by Ma Anliang) Their teaching of Islamic faith is relatively strongly fused with traditional culture.

It is mainly distributed in Lintan and Hezheng County in northwest China's Gansu Province, and also has followers in the province of Qinghai, the Autonomous Region Xinjiang and the province of Sichuan. It is a Hanafi school of the Sunni tradition similar to Qadim (Gedimu) has included Jahriyya elements.

Its founder, Ma Qixi, was heavily influenced by Chinese culture and religion like Confucianism, and Daoism, taking heavily from the Han Kitab, and he even took cues from Laozi, founder of Daoism.

== Yihewani ==
Yihewani (伊赫瓦尼; Ikhwan) 'Ixwān (إخوان) is a Hanafi (حنفي), (Note: One of the four major schools of Islamic law.) non-Sufi school of the Sunni tradition. It is also referred to as "new teaching" (Chinese: 新教派; pinyin: Xinjiao pai) or "latest teaching" (Chinese: 新新教; pinyin: Xinxinjiao). It is mainly in Qinghai, Ningxia and Gansu (there in Linxia) and distributed in Beijing, Shanghai, Henan, Shandong and Hebei. It was the end of the 19th century when the Dongxiang Imam Ma Wanfu (1849–1934) from the village of Guoyuan in Hezhou (now the Dongxiang Autonomous County was founded in Linxia Hui Autonomous Prefecture, Gansu Province) – who had studied in Mecca and was influenced by the Wahabi movement. After his return to Gansu and he founded the movement with the so-called "ten major Ahong" (Chinese: 十大阿訇; pinyin: shi da ahong). The school rejected Sufism. It claimed that the rites and ceremonies do not stand in line with the Quran and the Hadith and should be abolished. It is against grave and Murshid (leader/teacher) worship, and advocates against preaching (Da'wah) being done in Chinese. Muhammad bin Abdul Wahhab (محمد بن عبد الوهاب), Muhammad Amin al Birkawi (محمد أمين البركوي), and Ibn Tamiyya (ابن تيمية) and their Wahhabi (وهابي) Hanbali madhhab (المذهب الحنبلي) influenced the Yihewani in its foundation during the 19th century despite identifying itself as Hanafi.

The Khafiya Sufi Qing dynasty General Ma Anliang persecuted and executed Yihewani members, because they were considered part of the outlawed "New Teaching", in contrast to the Sufi Khafiya and Gedimu Sunni "Old Teaching".

Hu Songshan, a former Sufi who converted to the Yihewani sect, reformed the Yihewani, making it less hostile to Chinese culture, and integrated modern teaching, and Chinese nationalism into Yihewani teachings.

== Wahhabi/Salafi ==
Wahabbism is intensely opposed by rival Hui sects in China, by the Hanafi Sunni Gedimu and Sufi Khafiya and Jahriyya. The opposition is so much so that even the Yihewani Chinese sect, which is fundamentalist and was founded by Ma Wanfu, who was originally inspired by the Wahhabis, reacted with hostility to Ma Debao and Ma Zhengqing, who attempted to introduce Wahhabism/Salafism as the main form of Islam. They were branded as traitors and weirdos, and Wahhabi teachings were deemed as heresy by the Yihewani leaders. Ma Debao established a Salafi/Wahhabi order, called the Sailaifengye (赛莱菲耶; Salafi; سلفية) menhuan in Lanzhou and Linxia, a completely separate sect. None of the four Sunni Madhhab (مذاهب) are followed by the Salafis.

Salafis have a reputation for radicalism among the Hanafi Sunni Gedimu and Yihewani. Sunni Hui avoid Salafis, even if they are family members, and they constantly fight.

Among Hui Salafis and Uyghur Salafis, there is little coordination or cooperation and the two take different political agendas, with the Hui Salafists content to carry out their own teachings and remain politically neutral.

== Shias in China ==
Some Persian and Arab legends record that Zaidis fled to China from the Umayyads during the 8th century CE. At present, the Nizari Isma'ili branch is predominant among the Tajiks of Xinjiang. There is also a community of foreign (largely Iranian) Shia in Guangzhou and a community of Hui converts on Hainan Island.

The Äynu are generically identified as Muslims; however, the specific characteristics and practices of their religious traditions have not been well documented.

== Infighting between sects ==
There have been many occurrences of violent sectarian fighting between different Hui sects. Sectarian fighting between Sufi Hui sects led to the Jahriyya rebellion in the 1780s and the 1895 revolt.

It is claimed by some scholars that the intrusion of Sufism into China caused massive tensions in the Hui community which led to the Dungan revolt. Sufi groups engaged in violent disputes with each other, and with the "old teaching" (lao jiao), non-Sufi Gedimu Sunni Muslims who had been in China for centuries.

Violence was brought on by the introduction of the Jahriya by Ma Mingxin in 1761.

Both Hui Muslims and the Qing felt antagonized by the Jahriyya Hui order. Most revolts were due to the Naqshbandiyya. Heterodox status was attributed to the Jahriyya.

In the Jahriyya revolt sectarian violence between two suborders of the Naqshbandi Sufis, the Jahriyya Sufi Muslims and their rivals, the Khafiyya Sufi Muslims, led to a Jahriyya Sufi Muslim rebellion which the Qing dynasty in China crushed with the help of the Khafiyya Sufi Muslims. Owing to street fighting and lawsuits between the Jahriyya and Khufiyya Sufi orders, Ma Mingxin was arrested to stop the sectarian violence between the Sufis. The Jahriyya then tried to violently jailbreak Ma Mingxin, which led to his execution and the crushing of the Jahriyya rebels. The Khufiyya Sufis and Gedimu joined against the Jahriyya Sufis whom they fiercely opposed and differed from in practices. Salar Jahriyyas were among those deported to Xinjiang. Some Han Chinese joined and fought alongside the Jahriyya Salar Muslim rebels in their revolt.

Yaqub Beg's Uyghur forces declared a Jihad against Hui under T'o Ming during the Dungan revolt. The Uyghurs mistakenly thought that the Hui Muslims were Shafi`i, and since the Uyghurs were Hanafi that they should wage war against them. Yaqub Beg enlisted non-Muslim Han Chinese militia under Hsu Hsuehkung in order to fight against the Hui. T'o Ming's forces were defeated by Yaqub, who planned to conquer Dzungharia. Yaqub intended to seize all Dungan territory.

As mentioned in the above sections on each sect, fighting between them is common. It was Muslim Sufi inter-sect fighting that led to the Dungan revolt of 1862–1877, the Dungan revolt of 1895, and other rebellions.

The Qing authorities decreed that the Muslim rebels who were violently attacking were merely heretics, not representative of the entire Muslim population, like the heretical White Lotus did not represent all Buddhists. The Qing authorities decreed that there were two different Muslim sects, the "old" religion and "new" religion, and that the new were heretics and deviated like White Lotus deviated from Buddhism and Daoism, and stated its intention to inform the Muslim community that it was aware that the original Islamic religion was one united sect, before the new "heretics", saying they would separate Muslim rebels by which sect they belonged to.

Different sects used the Chinese legal system to try to sue each other out of existence. The first of these lawsuits came around 1748 by a Gedimu Imam against the Khuffiya Sufis. His lawsuit was dismissed, and he left the province. The Dungan revolt (1895–1896) started with a lawsuit when rival Sufi Naqshbandi orders fought against each other. They accused each other of various misdeeds and filed a lawsuit against each other through the office of the Xining prefect. The judge decided not to issue a ruling on which group was superior to the other in matters of all Islamic affairs and urged them to behave. This led to an increase in violent tension which led to the revolt.

The Chinese government was automatically apprehensive and distrustful of the Sufi orders, since heterodox Buddhists and Daoists, which were also banned, looked similar to the Sufi orders with their extensive organized structures and chanting rituals all night. Muslims who were not Sufi filed lawsuits against the Sufis, which stated that they were breaking the law by being heterodox and planning conspiracy. These factors help keep Sufi orders away from Lanzhou.

The Dungan Revolt (1895–1896) broke out in the same place as the Jahriyya revolt of 1781 for the same reasons, sectarian violence between two Naqshbandi Sufi orders. After rival Sufi Naqshbandi spiritual orders had fought and accused each other of various misdeeds, instead of continuing the violence they decided to use the Qing legal system to solve the dispute. They filed opposing lawsuits through the office of the Xining Prefect and the judge in the case decided not to issue a ruling on which group was superior to the other in matters of all Islamic affairs and urged them to behave. As a result, both groups resorted to violence. A daotai was sent by the Qing to crush the perpetrators of the violence, which ended in several deaths. This led the involved parties in the dispute to rebel against the Qing.

Other Muslim sects used the legal system to try to crush Ma Qixi's Xidaotang sect. The defendants in the court case, Ma Qixi and others received floggings before a second investigation was held and the case was dismissed.

Ma Lin (warlord) assisted the Xidaotang in filing a lawsuit against Ma Anliang after his death in 1919, to gain recognition for them as a legitimate Muslim sect.

The Khafiya Sufi General Ma Anliang, especially hated the Yihewani leader Ma Wanfu, so much that when the Han general Yang Zengxin captured Ma Wanfu, Ma Anliang arranged to have him shipped to Gansu so he could execute him. As Qing authority broke down in China, the Gedimu Sunnis and Khafiya Sufis went on a vicious campaign to murder Ma Wanfu and stamp out his Wahhabi inspired teachings. The leaders of menhuans attacked Ma Wanfu, and the Gedimu requested that the Qing governor in Lanzhou inflict punishment upon Ma Wanfu.

The Kuomintang general Ma Bufang, a Sufi Hui who backed the Yihewani (Ikhwan) Muslims, persecuted the Salafi/Wahhabis. The Yihewani forced the Salafis into hiding. They were not allowed to move or worship openly. The Yihewani had become secular and Chinese nationalist, and they considered the Salafiyya to be "heterodox" (xie jiao) and followers of foreigners' teachings (waidao). Only after the Communists took over were the Salafis allowed to come out and worship openly. Ma Bufang also repressed his fellow Sufis, including the menhuan he himself belonged to. The Communist regime carries on his policy of favoring the Ikhwan and repressing Sufis to this day. General Ma effectively repressed all non-Yihewani groups, including the traditional Sunni Gedimu, the oldest sect of Islam in China, doing things like enforcing Yihewani Imams on them. However, when the Communist party took over, the Gedimu used the Communist party's rules on freedom of religion to ward of the Yihewani practices and Imams.

The Gedimu forbade Yihewani (sunnaiti) from worshipping at their mosques, using knives to threaten them. They accused the other of being non-Muslims, and reportedly perceived each other as enemies. Intermarriage between the two were forbidden and family members belonging to either of the two split apart.

The Gedimu and Yihewani (Sunnaiti) accused the Salafis (santai) of being extremist (guoji), opposing their reform.

Jingtang Jiaoyu is a form of Islamic education, heavily influenced by Chinese culture, which the Gedimu Muslims pride themselves in learning. Jingtang Jiaoyu has been severely criticized for pronouncing Arabic incorrectly. Due to the limitations of Chinese characters, it propagates wrong pronunciation in Arabic. Many Hui who used it said Salaam Aleikun instead of Salaam Alaikum.

The Hanafi Sunni Gedimu cling fiercely to Chinese customs and the Jingtang Jiaoyu method of education, refusing to pronounce Arabic correctly even when learning of the correct pronunciation. Hanafi Sunni Sunnaiti's (Yihewani adherents) criticize the Gedimu for practicing Islamic customs influenced by Chinese culture, including Jingtang Jiaoyu, Sunnaiti's pride themselves on speaking correct Arabic, accusing the Gedimu Muslims of practicing Han and Buddhist customs and "Chinese Arabic". One Sunnaiti Imam said of the Gedimu, "blindly followed the traditions of their ancestors".

The Yihewani Imam Hu Songshan's son was Akhund Hu Xueliang (1918–1960), who was involved in an incident where a Muslim woman wanted a no-fault divorce from her absentee spouse in order to remarry. Having already waited for a decade, the period before which such divorce was allowed had been a matter of scholarly disagreement, interpreted to be 4 years in the Maliki madhhab and 90 years in the Hanafi Madhhab. (Note: The interpretation cited here is by no means mainstream. The scholarly consensus is that Hanafis, Shafi'is, and some Hanbalis generally don't allow a no-fault divorce from an absent husband; while Malikis and other Hanbalis do but disagree on the period of absence. The allowing Hanbalis consider it to be 6 months or more, while Malikis go with at least one year and still leave it to the judge's discretion.) Hu Xueliang decided to consult Maliki Madhhab rules and allow the woman to divorce, which was also supported by the Communist government. However, due to the orthodox status of and zeal for Hanafi jurisprudence, the locals might have even considered other schools to be heretic, so a violent uprising broke out against Hu Xueliang that Hu had to be guarded by the PLA from attacks by other Muslims.

Inter-sectarian violence between Muslims within the Old Sect broke out in 1992 and resulted in 49 deaths, a court in Ningxia convicted 20 of starting the sectarian riots in February 1994.

After a hiatus after the People's Republic of China came to power, sectarian in fighting resumed in the 1990s in Ningxia between different sects. Several sects refuse to intermarry with each other. Šarḥ Sayf ad-Dīn (شرح سيف الدين), an anti-Wahhabi pamphlet and silsila (سلسلة) was circulated by the Sufi sect Naqshbandiyya Mujaddidiyya (نقشبندية مجددية صوفية).

== See also ==
- Islam in China
- Islam in Taiwan
- Menhuan 门宦
- Gongbei 拱北
- Gedimu
- Liu Zhi 刘智 (1660 – 1745)
- Tekke (罕卡 Khanqah, 扎维叶 Zawiya)
- Chinese Islamic architecture
