= Haicheng =

Haicheng (Chinese: 海城 unless otherwise noted) may refer to the following locations in China:

- Haicheng, Liaoning, a county-level city in Liaoning
- Haicheng District, a district of Beihai, Guangxi

== Towns ==
- Haicheng, Fujian (海澄镇), in Longhai, Fujian
- Haicheng, Guangdong, in Haifeng County, Guangdong
- Haicheng, Ningxia, in Haiyuan County, Ningxia

== Townships ==
- Haicheng Township, Guangxi, in Pingguo County, Guangxi
- Haicheng Township, Heilongjiang, in Zhaodong, Heilongjiang

== Other ==
- "Hai Cheng", a 2022 song by The8
