= Qingzhen Zhinan =

Philosophical treatise on Islam by Ma Zhu

- Original title: 清真指南
- Language: Chinese
- Publication date: 1683
- Publication place: China (Qing dynasty)
- Media type: Print

Qingzhen Zhinan
- Chinese: 清真指南
Transcriptions
Standard Mandarin
- Hanyu Pinyin: Qīngzhēn Zhǐnán
- Wade–Giles: Ch'ing-chen Chih-nan

Qingzhen Zhinan (清真指南), (Note: Translated into English as The Compass of Islam or The Guide to Islam.) also known as al-Murshid ilā ‘Ulūm al-Islām, (Note: Translated into English as The Guide to the Sciences of Islam.) is a philosophical treatise on Islam written by Chinese Hanafi-Maturidi scholar Ma Zhu and first published in 1683. It later became part of the Han Kitab, a collection of Chinese Islamic texts written in the late Ming and early Qing dynasties.

== Contents ==
Dragons can soar, tigers can bite, bulls can gore, horses can kick, cocks can rouse, dogs can guard, apes can climb, rats can burrow, silkworms can spin, spiders can make a web, ants can form ranks, bees can make honey—their forms are different, so too their special abilities; their diets vary, as do their voices. These are analogous to artisans making tools. Though their forms and collection are dissimilar—the square and round, horizontal and vertical, small and large, long and short—each is appropriate to its function. We can see the subtle working of their use and know the craftsman's remarkable skill. No one, gazing on the craftsman's uncanny skill, could possibly call it the thing's own inherent nature. Why do bells not give birth to bells? Why do drums not give birth to drums? Can a wooden horse whinny, or a stone cow low?

— Ma Zhu invoking the watchmaker analogy.

The preface written by Ma himself has the earliest recorded use of the term huiru (回儒) in reference to "Confucian Muslim" scholars. The work also contains some two dozen "ceremonial prefaces and dedications", including a poem by Liu Zhi's father. The main work comprises eight volumes that cover topics as orthopraxy and orthodoxy, the history of Islam, Islamic cosmology, and Sharia. Ma Zhu argues that Islam is superior to Confucianism, and devotes an entire volume to denouncing the "heterodox" Sufis who had gained a following in his native Yunnan: he writes that their teachings and practices both violated Sharia and Confucianism and recommends "official persecution" of them.

== Publication history ==
Wishing to spread the message of Islam across China and to be officially recognised as a sayyid by the Kangxi Emperor, Ma Zhu completed the earliest manuscript of Qingzhen Zhinan in 1683. He went about China afterwards, meeting notable ahong and Islamic scholars to gather feedback on his book. The work underwent several revisions, with the final edition being published in 1710. According to Yuan-lin Tsai, Qingzhen Zhinan is "the first comprehensive introductory work to Islam in Chinese". It was later collected in the Han Kitab, a collection of Chinese Islamic texts written in the late Ming and early Qing dynasties.

== Reception ==
Qingzhen Zhinan was praised by Chinese Muslims and "became probably the single most respected of the many works written by Chinese Muslim scholars", but received a "less enthusiastic response" by contemporaneous Confucian thinkers who were "conservative and somewhat xenophobic". According to Jonathan Lipman, writing in his 2016 book Islamic Thought in China, Qingzhen Zhinan was "unsuccessful in persuading non-Muslims of God’s cosmogenetic power" but "remains popular among Sino-Muslims, who combine Chinese and Islamic cultures in their intellectual and religious lives." Yuan-lin Tsai accused Ma of bias, while stating that his work was "much less philosophical" than that of Wang Daiyu and failed to make a "substantive contribution to the comparative discourse of Islam and Confucianism". According to scholar Kristian Petersen, Ma's "monumental" work was part of an effort that "set the stage for an important restyling of Islamic education and scholarship within the Chinese context."
