= Yusuf Ma Dexin =

Chinese Islamic scholar

- 馬德新 / 马德新

Personal life
- Born: 1794 Taihe (present-day Dali, Yunnan), Yunnan, Qing China
- Died: 1874 Yunnan, Qing China
- Home town: Dali, Yunnan
- Era: 19th century
- Region: China, Yunnan
- Main interest(s): Islamic theology, Islamic jurisprudence, Quranic studies, Arabic grammar, Islamic philosophy, Confucianism, Islamic history and calendrical studies
- Notable idea(s): Explaining Islamic doctrines through Chinese philosophical concepts, seeking points of agreement between Islam and Confucianism
- Notable work(s): Baoming Zhenjing Zhijie (宝命真经直解), Chaojin Tuji (朝觐途记), Sidian Yaohui (四典要会), Dahua Zonggui (大化总归), Tianfang Liyuan (天方历源)
- Education: Traditional Islamic studies, Arabic, Persian, Chinese classics, advanced study during travels in the Middle East and the Ottoman Empire
- Known for: Chinese-language expositions and translations of Islamic texts, development of Islamic scholarship in Yunnan, involvement in the Panthay Rebellion
- Other names: Ma Fuchu (馬復初 / 马复初, courtesy name), Ma Tesing, Ma Lao Baba (馬老巴巴), Yūsuf (يوسف), ʿAbd al-Qayyūm Rūḥ al-Dīn Yūsuf (عبد القيوم روح الدين يوسف), Mawlānā al-Ḥājj Yūsuf Rūḥ al-Dīn Ma Fujuh (مولانا الحاج يوسف روح الدين ما فو جوه)
- Occupation: Islamic scholar, Theologian, translator, teacher, author

Religious life
- Religion: Islam
- Denomination: Sunni
- Jurisprudence: Hanafi
- Creed: Maturidi
- Movement: Han Kitab

Muslim leader
- Teacher: Zhou Baba (周良骏), a fourth-generation student in the teaching lineage of Hu Dengzhou
- Post: Shaykh al-Islam of Yunnan, a title conferred by the Qing government
- Influenced by: Confucianism, Islamic jurisprudence and theology, Islamic reformist currents encountered during his pilgrimage and travels
- Influenced: Ma Lianyuan (馬聯元), Ma Anli (馬安禮)

Yusuf Ma Dexin (also Ma Tesing; 1794–1874) was a Hui Hanafi-Maturidi scholar from Yunnan, known for his fluency and proficiency in both Arabic and Persian, and for his knowledge of Islam. He also went by the Chinese name Ma Fuchu. He used the Arabic name Abd al-Qayyum Ruh al-Din Yusuf (عبد القيوم روح الدين يوسف). He was also styled as "Mawlana al-Hajj Yusuf Ruh al-Din Ma Fujuh" (مولانا الحاج يوسف روح الدين ما فو جوه).

== Biography ==
Ajall Shams al-Din Omar was an ancestor in the 25th generation of Ma Dexin.

=== Hajj ===
Ma performed the Hajj in 1841, leaving China by a circuitous route; as ocean travel out of China had been disrupted by the First Opium War, he chose instead to leave with a group of Muslim merchants travelling overland. After passing through the Sipsong Panna, they went south to Konbaung Burma, then took a riverboat along the Irrawaddy River from Mandalay to Yangon. From Yangon, they were able to board a steamship, which took them to the Arabian Peninsula.

After Mecca, Ma stayed in the Middle East for another eight years; he first went to Cairo, where he studied at al-Azhar University, then travelled throughout the Ottoman Empire, going to Suez, Alexandria, Jerusalem, Istanbul, Cyprus, and Rhodes.

=== Return to China ===
As a prominent Muslim in Yunnan, Ma became involved in the Panthay Rebellion in Yunnan shortly after he returned from the Hajj. The Panthay Rebellion, which flared up in 1856 as part of a wider series of uprisings by the Hui (Muslim Han Chinese) and other minorities, was led mainly by Du Wenxiu; though Ma disagreed with Du's revolutionary methods, he also encouraged his followers to aid in the uprising; later, he would try to act as a peacemaker between the central government forces and the rebels. Ma Dexin said that Neo-Confucianism was reconcilable with Islam. He approved of General Ma Rulong defecting to the Qing and he also assisted other Muslims in defecting. However, despite his efforts to bring about peace, the Qing government still regarded him as a rebel and a traitor; he was executed two years after the suppression of the rebellion. Europeans reported that he was either poisoned or executed.

== Role in the Panthay Rebellion ==
Ma Dexin was the most prominent Hui scholar in Yunnan. He used his prestige to act as a mediator between the different Hui factions & "helped orient and validate" the rebellion throughout the province. He was respected by both Du Wenxiu & Ma Rulong as a spiritual leader. In 1860; Ma Dexin sent forces to help Du Wenxiu fight the Qing; assuring him that:

"I have already secretly ordered my disciples [mensheng] Ma [Rulong] as the Grand Commander of Three Directions, with Ma Rong as second in command . . . to launch a rearguard attack from their base in Yimen."

Ma Dexin possessed a telescope that he had purchased while in Singapore, yet was unable to use it. In late 1867, M. Garnier a member of a French expedition met Ma in Kunming and adjusted the lenses for him. A grateful Ma then agreed to write for them a letter of recommendation to Du Wenxiu. Ma also asked officials along the route to Dali to provide the best service to the French Explorers. Muslim soldiers let the explorers pass due to Ma's letter.

== Surrender to the Qing ==
There is evidence that Ma Dexin, Ma Rulong & the Hui forces with them only pretended to surrender (in 1862) in order to gain access to the city of Kunming. Even after their supposed capitulation to the Qing; Ma Rulong continued to issue proclamations using his seal "Generalissimo of the Three Directions" while Ma Dexin refused to accept the Civil title granted to him; not wanting to be associated with the Qing regime. The Hui rebels taunted the Hui who hadn't joined the rebellion as being fake Hui (jia Huizi). Taiwanese researcher Li Shoukong asserts that many Hui rebels had employed a similar tactic of pretending to surrender in the early years of the rebellion.

To test his loyalty Ma Rulong was sent to pacify the disgruntled magistrate of Lin'an (in Southern Yunnan). A few weeks after Ma Rulong left the city; rebel forces led by Ma Rong and Ma Liansheng stormed Kunming & captured it. Ma Rulong's forces had come to believe that he could no longer be trusted to achieve their goal of uniting under a single rebel government. In 1863 Ma Dexin declared himself "King-Who-Pacifies-the-South (Pingnan Wang)", seized the official seals & stopped using the Qing reign year when dating documents. Ma Dexin hoped to keep the rebel forces united under him until he could hand over control to Du Wenxiu.

Ma Rulong immediately rushed back to Kunming, and attacked the city along with Qing forces;. He ordered Ma Dexin to give up his seals of office & placed him under house arrest. According to a French missionary, Ma Rulong "arrested Lao Baba [Ma Dexin] whose conduct, as you know, has always been very ambiguous, but not any more. This old fox was consigned to the palace in which Ma [Rulong's] family lives."

Ma Dexin opposed Ma Rulong's acceptance of the Qing policy of "using Hui to fight other Hui". When he travelled to Dali to meet Du Wenxiu for their only and final meeting, he told him that:

"The provincial government has given Eastern Hui leaders' official positions so that the Hui will fight each other. This is the cruelest of [the Qing's] furtive plots. So we must turn it around [and use it] against them . . . why should we fall into their trap?"

He also warned Du that:

"We should, have the [Qing] government fall into a Hui plan, not let the Hui fall into the government's [plan]."

== Execution ==
The Qing official Cen Yuying disliked Ma Dexin and the Hui. In April 1874 he ordered an investigation into Ma Dexin's activities and charged him along with three others of formenting unrest. Cen claimed that when Ma Dexin was found he was on a hunger strike & on the brink of death, hence he ordered that Ma be "summarily executed". Though few Hui were convinced by Cen's words and knew that Ma had been assassinated.

== Works ==
Sources say that Ma produced the first Chinese translation of the Qur'an, as well as writing numerous books in Arabic and Persian about Islam. His most famous writings compared Islamic culture and the Confucian philosophy to find a theoretical and theological basis for their coexistence. At the same time, he harshly criticised the absorption of Buddhist and Taoist elements into the practise of Islam in China. As he is generally regarded as an orthodox Islamic thinker, his writings also demonstrated a positive attitude towards Sufism. In total, he published over 30 books, most of which fall into five categories.

- Islamic jurisprudence and philosophy: 四典要会, 大化总归, 道行究竟, 理学折衷, 性命宗旨, 礼法启爱 据理质证,
- Islamic calendar and history: 寰宇述要 (Description of the World), 天方历源 (History of Arabia)
- Introduction and analysis of works of other Muslim authors in China, such as Ma Zhu and Liu Zhu: 真诠要录, 指南要言, 天方性理注释
- Qur'an: the first five volumes of 宝命真经直解 (True Revealed Scripture), the earliest translation of the meanings of the Qur'an into Chinese
- Arabic grammar: 纳哈五 (Nahawu), 赛尔夫 (Saierfu), 阿瓦米勒 (Awamile)
- Other: 朝觐途记 (Diary of a pilgrimage), a description of his time in Mecca; originally in Arabic, translated to Chinese by Ma's disciple Ma Anli

Ma Dexin appears to have picked up anti-Shia views from his time in the Ottoman lands and referred to them by the derogatory name Rafida (若废子) in his works, which attacked and criticized Shias and some Sufis. Ma, like other most other Hui in China, belonged to the Hanafi school of Sunni Islam.

The Chinese Muslim Arabic writing scholars Ma Lianyuan 馬聯元 1841-1903 was trained by Ma Fuchu 馬复初 1794-1874 in Yunnan with Ma Lianyuan writing books on law 'Umdat al-'Islām (عمدة الإسلام), a grammar book on ṣarf (صرف) called Hawā, and Ma Fuchu writing a grammar book on naḥw (نحو) called Muttasiq (متسق) and Kāfiya (كافية). Šarḥ al-laṭā'if (شرح اللطائف) Liu Zhi's The Philosophy of Arabia 天方性理 (Tianfang Xingli) Arabic translation by (Muḥammad Nūr al-Ḥaqq ibn Luqmān as-Ṣīnī) (محمد نور الحق ابن لقمان الصيني), the Arabic name of Ma Lianyuan. Du'a, ghusl, salah, and other ceremonies were taught in the Miscellaneous studies (Zaxue) 雜學 while ayat from the Qur'an were taught in the Khatm al-Qur'an (ختم القرآن) (Haiting). Ma Fuchu brought al-Būṣīrī's Qaṣīdat al-Burda (格随德集注) to China.

== See also ==
- Islam in China
- Wang Daiyu
- Ma Zhu
- Liu Zhi (scholar), an earlier Muslim scholar who also attempted to reconcile Islam and Confucian philosophy
- Muhammad Ma Jian, a later Chinese translator of the Qur'an who also studied at Al-Azhar
- List of Hanafis
- List of Ash'aris and Maturidis
- List of Muslim theologians

== Sources ==
=== Notes ===
- This article incorporates text from The history of China, Volume 2, by Demetrius Charles de Kavanagh Boulger, a publication from 1898, now in the public domain in the United States.

=== Further reading ===
- Akiro MATSUMOTO (松本耿郎) (2004-05-24). "波斯与云南回族的"万有单一论"哲学". Eichi University, Department of Literature. Archived from the original on 2007-09-28.
- SUN Junping (孙俊萍) (2006). "马复初伊斯兰哲学中关于和平思想的发展". 回族研究 (2).
- SUN Zhenyu (孙振玉). "试评清代云南回民起义中的马德新". Ningxia University Nationalities Research Center. Archived from the original on 2007-10-11.
