= Ma Qixi =

Chinese Islamic scholar (1857–1914)

- 馬啟西 / 马启西
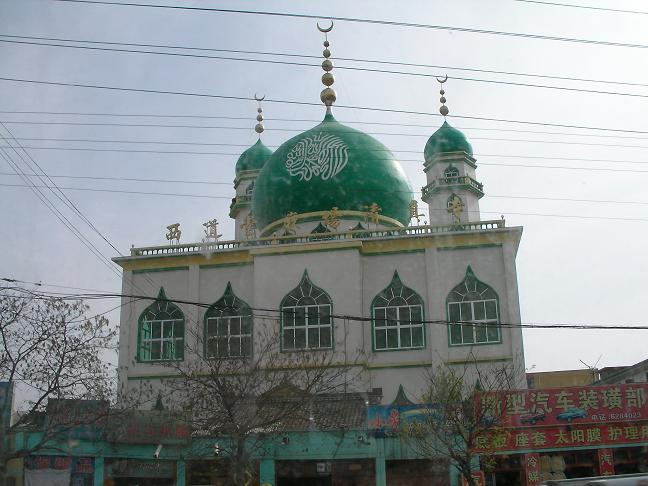
- Xidaotang Machang Mosque in Linxia City, associated with the religious community founded by Ma Qixi
- Title: Jiaozhu (教主), head of Xidaotang

Personal life
- Born: Ma Chunsheng (馬春生); 1857 Wangjiazui, Lintan County, Gansu, Qing China
- Died: 1914 Xihetan, near Taozhou Jiucheng, Lintan County, Gansu, Republic of China
- Resting place: Tombs associated with Ma Qixi in Lintan County, Gansu
- Parent(s): Ma Yuan (father), daughter of the shaykh of the Beizhuang branch of the Khufiyya (mother)
- Era: Late 19th–early 20th centuries
- Region: Northwest China, particularly Gansu and Qinghai
- Education: Private academy of Fan Shengwu in New Taozhou
- Other names: Yaḥyā (葉海亞), Gonghui (公惠), Cixiang (慈祥), Xijiyuan (西極園), Ma Chi-hsi (Wade–Giles), ﻣَﺎ چِ ثِ (Xiao'erjing)
- Occupation: Islamic scholar, educator, religious leader, community founder

Religious life
- Religion: Islam
- Denomination: Sunni
- Order: Formerly affiliated with the Beizhuang branch of the Khufiyya until 1901
- School: Han Kitab tradition
- Jurisprudence: Hanafi
- Movement: Xidaotang, also known as the Han Studies School (Hanxuepai)

Muslim leader
- Post: Founder and first head of Xidaotang
- Influenced by: Liu Zhi, Wang Daiyu, Ma Zhu, the religious thought of Ma Mingxin, Confucian and Neo-Confucian classics, the Han Kitab tradition
- Influenced: Ma Yingcai, Ma Jianyuan, Ding Zhonghe, the Xidaotang community and its later religious and educational leadership

Ma Qixi (1857–1914; simplified Chinese: 马启西; traditional Chinese: 馬啟西; pinyin: Mǎ Qǐxī; Wade–Giles: Ma Chi-hsi, Xiao'erjing: ﻣَﺎ چِ ثِ), a Hui from Gansu, was the founder of the Xidaotang, a Chinese-Islamic school of thought.

== Education and teaching ==
Ma was born into the family of a Táozhōu ahong of the Beizhuang menhuan, a Sufi order. At 11 years of age, he studied with a non-Muslim who was an examination graduate at the private academy he attended. He was introduced to the senior licentiate, Fan Shengwu, whose school was at New Taozhou. Ma placed second in the Táozhōu examination and fourth in the prefectural examination in Gongchang, achieving the rank of xiucai.

He studied Neo-Confucian texts and the Han Kitab. Wang Daiyu, Ma Zhu, Liu Zhi, and others had synthesized Confucianism with Islam. Ma believed Muslims should use Chinese culture to understand Islam. He opened his own school, Gold Star Hall (Jinxing Tang) at a gongbei of his menhuan. He taught Islam, Chinese curriculum, and the Han Kitab. Ma became an independent instructor; the Khafiya Sufis called him heterodox or an infidel for his success and unconventional curriculum.

The strife between Biezhuang and Hausi went to court in 1902, and the Taozhou subprefect proscribed Ma's teachings and beat his followers. The verdict was reversed by a higher court sympathetic to the Xidaotang.

Ma set up a mosque in Taozhou. Taking a cue from Laozi, the Daoist sage, Ma and several disciples—Ma Yingcai, Ma Jianyuan, and Ding Zhonghe—went on a hajj to Mecca in 1905. They were stuck in Samarkand, and spent three years teaching among the Baishan (white mountain) Sufis. Ma Yingcai died on the journey.

== Xidaotang ==
In 1909 Ma and the surviving disciples were welcomed back to Lintan by Ding Quande and his son Ding Yongxiang. Ma opened a school called the Xidaotang ("Western Hospice" or "Hall of the Western Dao"). He felt strong attachment to Chinese culture, and when Qing fell in 1912, the Xidaotang men cut their queues and the women unbound their feet.

== Death ==
In 1914, the Khafiya Sufi general Ma Anliang tried to exterminate the Xidaotang and Ma. Ma's Arabic name was Esa (Jesus). Ma Anliang was jealous of the Xidaotang's success, so when the bandit Bai Lang attacked Gansu in 1914, Ma Anliang seized it as an excuse. His troops seized and shot Ma and 17 of his family and followers on the west river.

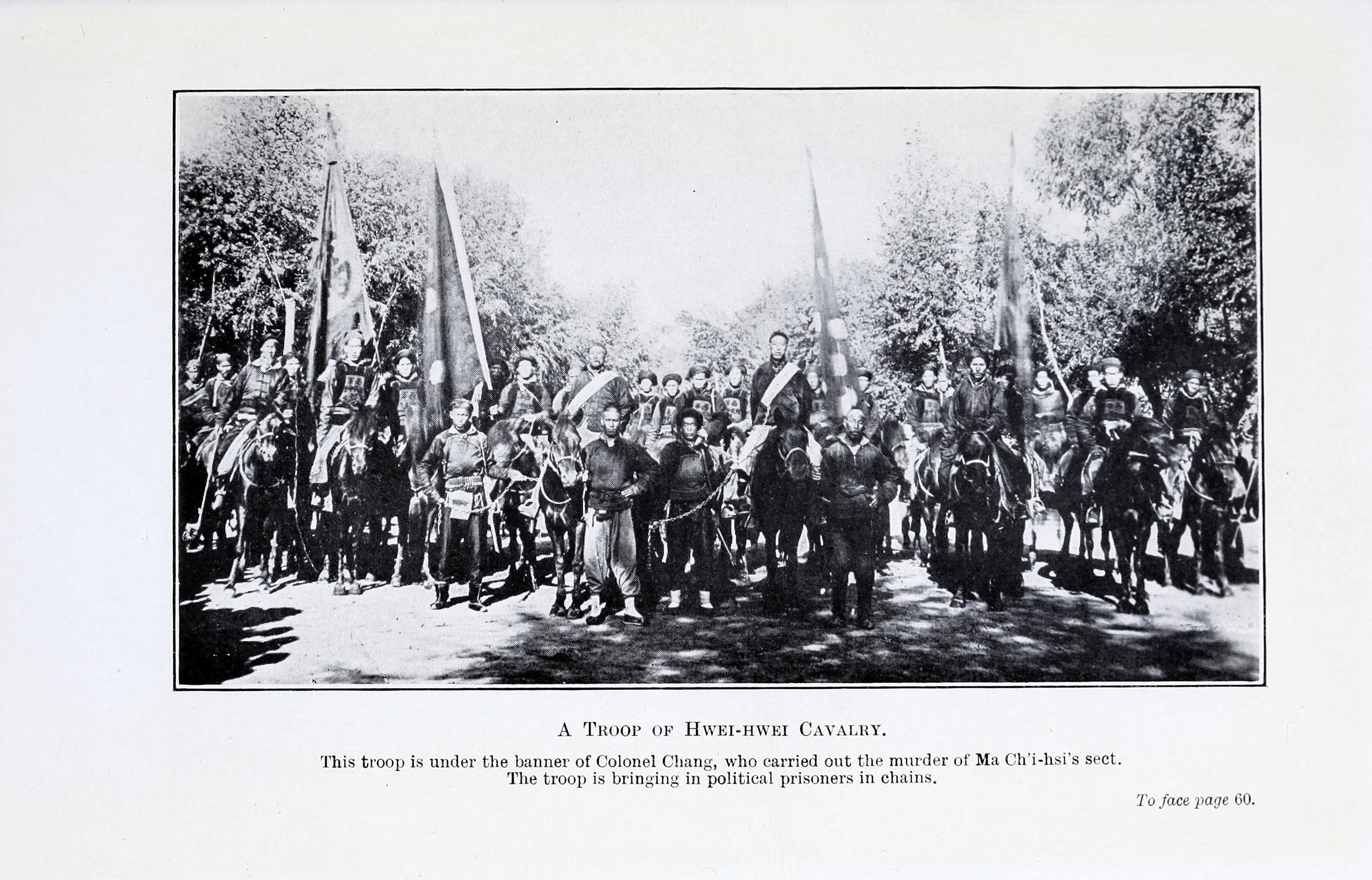
Ma Anliang's Cavalry commanded by a "Colonel Chang". This unit carried out the extermination of the Xidaotang

Ma Qixi's Muslim Xidaotang repulsed and defeated Bai Lang's bandit forces, who looted the city of Táozhōu but Muslim general Ma Anliang slaughtered Muslim sect leader Ma Qixi and his family after the war. The bandits were notable for anti-Muslim sentiment, massacring thousands of Muslims at Taozhou. Muslim Khufiyya Sufi general Ma Anliang was only concerned with defending Lanzhou and his own home base in Hezhou (Linxia) in central Gansu where his followers lived and not the rival Xidaotang sect Muslims under Muslim leader Ma Qixi in southern Gansu's minor towns like Taozhou so he let Bai Lang ravage Taozhou and other towns in southern Gansu while passively defending Lanzhou and Hezhou. The North China Herald and Reginald Farrer accused Ma Anliang of betraying his fellow Muslims by letting them get slaighterd at Taozhou. Ma Anliang then arrested Ma Qixi after falsely accusing him of striking a deal with Bai Lang and had Ma Qixi and his family slaughtered. After another Muslim warlord, Ma Zhongying attacked and massacred the rival Muslim Xidaotang and seized their headquarters and also attacked Tibetans, Xidaotang followers fled into ethnic Tibetan populated areas of Qinghai for safety. The Xidaotang then pledged allegiance to the reformed Kuomintang in 1932 and Xidaotang leader Ma Mingren met with Kuomintang Muslim general Bai Chongxi and leader Chiang Kai-shek in 1941 in Chongqing while supplying the Kuomintang government with leather and other products while fighting against the Japanese.
