= Xidaotang =

Sino-Islamic community

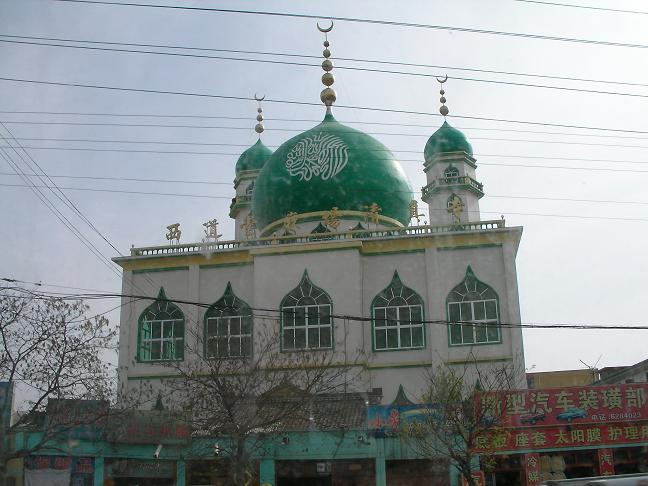
Machang Mosque in Linxia, Gansu, is a mosque of the Xidaotang sect.

Xidaotang (Chinese: 西道堂; pinyin: Xīdàotáng, "Hall of the Western Dao," i.e. Islam) - originally called Jinxingtang 金星堂, the "Gold Star Hall"; also called the Hanxue pai 汉学派, the "Han Studies Sect" - is a Sino-Islamic religious body/special economic community centered in Gansu province. The Xidaotang is mainly distributed in Lintan and Hezheng County in Gansu, and also has followers in Qinghai, Xinjiang, and Sichuan.

== Practices ==
Its religious practices broadly resemble those of the Qadim (Gedimu), with some Jahriyya elements. Great emphasis is placed on shari'a (jiaocheng 教乘), and tariqa (daocheng 道乘), "which gradually leads to depersonalization and mystical union with God." Its members organize collectively and work together. One important focus is education. The group observes such holidays as the birthday of the Islamic prophet Muhammad (Mawlid an-Nabi), the anniversary of his death, and the anniversary of the death of Ma Qixi. However, no mausoleum was built for Ma Qixi.

== History ==
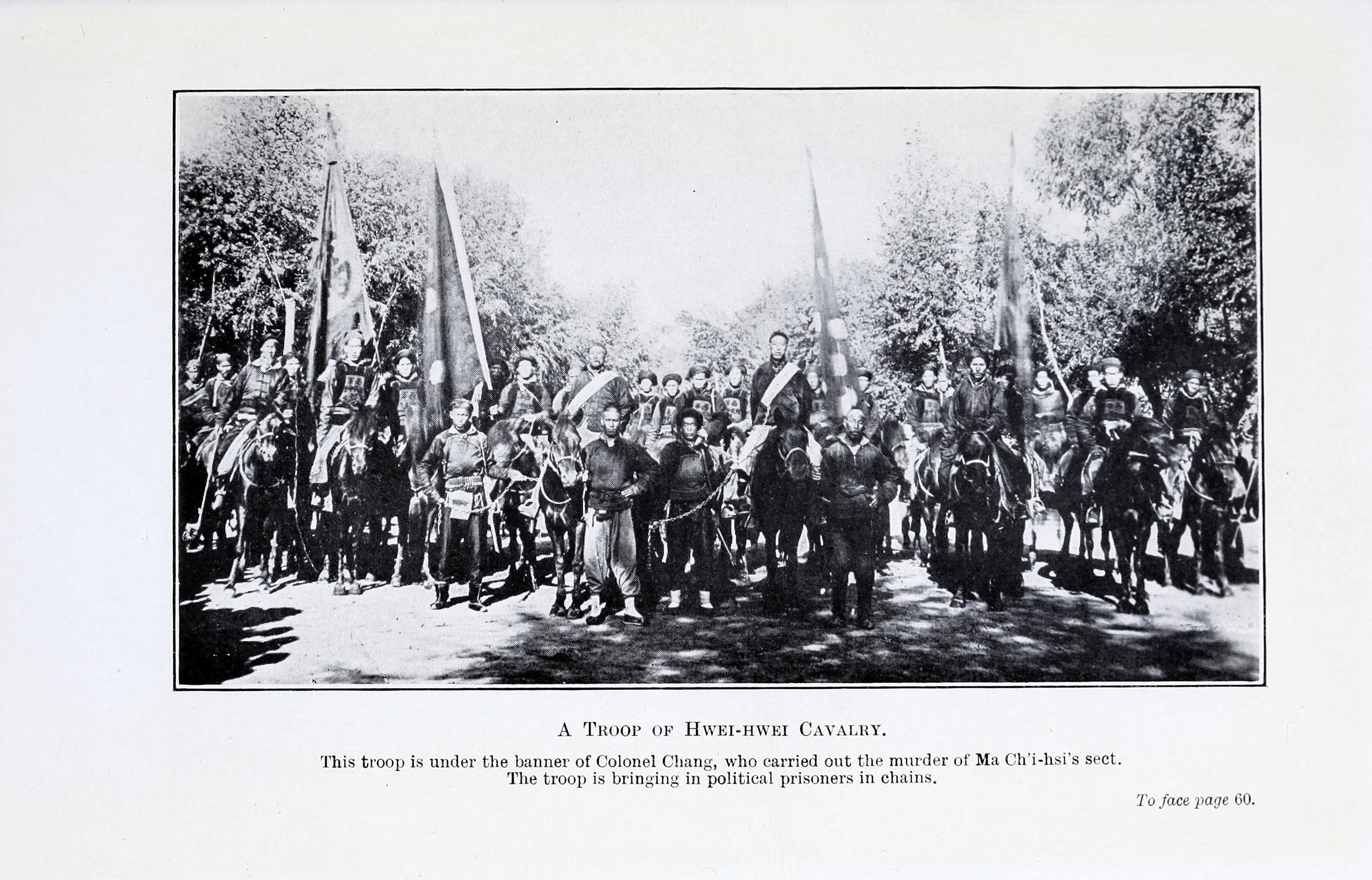
Ma Anliang's Cavalry commanded by a "Colonel Chang". This unit carried out the extermination of the Xidaotang.

Founded in 1901 by Ma Qixi (1857–1914), a Chinese Muslim from Lintan (formerly Taozhou), it fuses traditional Sunni Hanafi Islam with study of the Confucian classics and the Han Kitab. The group lived communally, supporting itself through a trade network which extended into the Tibetan border regions.

In 1914, Hui general Ma Anliang, affiliated with the rival Khufiyya order, slew Ma Qixi, and was nearly successful in exterminating the sect, but a portion evaded capture. Hui warlord Ma Zhongying raided Hui and Tibetan encampments in the 1920s, causing another exodus. The Xidaotang pledged allegiance to the Kuomintang after their rise to power, and in 1941, the Hui General Bai Chongxi introduced Chiang Kai-shek to Xidaotang leader Ma Mingren in Chongqing.

Other leaders in the movement were:

- 1918-1946: Ma Mingren (马明仁, 1896–1946)
- 1947-1958: Min Xuecheng (敏学成, 1882–1957) (i.e. Min Zhidao).

== See also ==
- Muslim groups in China
- menhuan 门宦
- gongbei 拱北
- Gedimu
- Liu Zhi 刘智 (1660–1745)
- Tekke (罕卡[hanka] Khanqah, 扎维叶[zaweiye] Zawiya)
- Ma Qixi
