= Bai Lang Rebellion =

Chinese rebellion against Yuan Shikai (1913–1914)

Date	1913–1914
Location	China
Result	Defeat of Bai Lang and his bandit army

Belligerents
Republic of China; Self-defense forces: "Future-Safeguarding Society"; Jahriyya menhuan; Xidaotang	Bai Lang's army Allies: Qing dynasty loyalists; Royalist Party; Big Swords Society's "Seas and Lakes Society"; Kuomintang (from 1913); Other bandit groups; Gelaohui

Commanders and leaders
(Republic of China (1912–1949)) Yuan Shikai; (Republic of China (1912–1949)) Duan Qirui; (Republic of China (1912–1949)) Lu Jianzhang; (Republic of China (1912–1949)) Ma Anliang; (Republic of China (1912–1949)) Ma Qi; (Republic of China (1912–1949)) Ma Yuanzhang; (Republic of China (1912–1949)) Ma Qixi; (Republic of China (1912–1949)) Yang Jiqing	Bai Lang

Units involved
Beiyang Army; 7th Division; 14th Brigade; Han Chinese, Hui, and Tibetan militias	Various bandit groups

Strength
12,000	Bai Lang's army: c. 5,000 (early 1913)

Casualties and losses
- Thousands of civilian casualties

The Bai Lang Rebellion was a Chinese "bandit" rebellion lasting from mid 1913 to late 1914. Launched against the Beiyang government of Yuan Shikai, the rebellion was led by Bai Lang. His rebel army was an eclectic mix of anti-Yuan Shikai troops and rebels, bandit groups and Gelaohui (secret society) members. As a unit, they were allied to southern Guangdong based revolutionaries.

Naqshbandi Khufiyya Sufi Muslim general Ma Anliang took advantage of the war to allow the massacre of the rival Muslim Xidaotang sect and then to execute the Muslim leader of the Xidaotang, Ma Qixi and his family.

== Bai Lang: The individual ==
Bai Yung-chang or Bai Langzai, more commonly known by his pseudonym Bai Lang, was born in 1873, in Baofeng, Henan, to a wealthy family. As a youth, Bai took a variety of "hands-on" jobs including employment as a government salt transporter and service as an anti-bandit militiaman. Nevertheless, his life changed in 1897 when he was arrested for getting into a fight with a man named Wang Zhen who died during the altercation. After getting out of jail, Bai Lang was only dissuaded from becoming a bandit by his family, instead, turning his martial interests towards a legal outlet (namely, military service).

During the last years of Manchu rule, Bai was trained in tactics and weaponry in Japan, known at the time as much for its Chinese revolutionary activity as for its competence in modern military warfare. Upon his return, Bai was appointed to serve in the Qing's Beiyang Army and, at the outbreak of the Xinhai Revolution at the Wuchang Uprising in 1911, was assigned to the Beiyang 6th Division at Shihkiachwang as an adjutant to Gen. Wu Luzhen, Commander of the Sixth Division. Soon thereafter, the pro-revolutionary Gen. Wu was assassinated by Beiyang Army troops loyal to Yuan Shikai and Bai was forced to return home for fear of his life. Wu's assassination, thought to have been at the order of Yuan Shikai, allegedly took place because Yuan could not trust Wu whose presence at Shihkiachwang controlled the vital rail link from Wuhan to Beijing. These events strengthened Bai's resolve against Yuan and those who came to support him. After a series of storms ravaged the region's crops in late 1911, Bai and other local people fell in with the bandit Du Qibin.

Before Bai Lang defected to the Republicans and became Henan's governor, he was originally a Qing loyalist.

== The rebellion ==
Bai Lang and his forces allied themselves with the Kuomintang during the so-called "Second Revolution", an attempt by the latter party to resist President Yuan Shikai's increasingly authoritarian regime. The bandit leader managed to amass an army of 1,000 to 4,000 fighters, and started to target in the area between Wuhan and Beijing, attacking the railway lines. Yuan responded by sending the Beiyang Army under the personal command of Duan Qirui to destroy Bai Lang and his bandits. Despite being hunted by thousands of regular soldiers, Bai managed to remain active even after the Second Revolution's defeat. Waging a guerrilla war, he evaded the government and ravaged no less than 50 cities in central China. Strategically, his purported intent was to use guerilla warfare to disrupt the rail line to Beijing. By doing so, it was thought he could disrupt the flow of freight and revenue between North and South China. If successful, the foreign powers could view Yuan's China as unstable and unwilling to loan Yuan the money he needed to sustain his regime. Bai Lang's "march" into Anhui Province towards Shanghai was seen by some as a bold effort to link up with Revolutionary interests now holed up in Shanghai and to provoke a possible "Third Revolution" against Yuan.

Bai's actions caused mixed outpourings of mass support and popular outrage, with his army variously called by itself and supporters "The Citizen's Punitive Army", "Citizen's Army to Exterminate Bandits" and "The Army to Punish Yuan Shikai", among others. As his fame grew, deserters, bandits and revolutionaries bolstered his divisions and he swiftly moved through Henan, Anhui, Hupei, Shaanxi and Kansu, disrupting swaths of Northern China. In Henan, the city of Yuxian, famed for its vital pharmaceutical industry, was ransacked of everything from medicine to guns and the military governor, Zhang Zhenfang, was dismissed for his failure to suppress the uprising. Support from peasants grew due to Bai's anti-gentry and anti-tax stance (slogans like "take from the rich and give to the poor" increased rural support, as did the murder of magistrates and the distribution of grain stores). Only after ten divisions of the Beiyang Army, at least 12,000 troops, had been deployed against them, the bandits were forced to retreat westward. Under tremendous military pressure from the government and allied warlords, including some of the earliest use of aircraft in warfare, Bai's "army" crossed the Tongguan Pass into Shaanxi Province, possibly with an eye toward sympathetic linkage there. Instead, his group was forced even further west into Gansu. Upon entering Gansu, the rebellion encountered strong civil and military resistance.

Yuan Shikai ordered Ma Anliang to block Bai Lang (White Wolf) from going into Szŭchʻuan and Kansu by blocking Hanchung and Fengsiang. Yuan Shikai managed to induce Ma Anliang to not attack Shaanxi after the Gelaohui took over the province and accept the Republic of China under his presidency in 1912. Ma Anliang ensured Gansu remained loyal to Yuan Shukai during the Bai Lang (White Wolf) rebellion. During the National Protection war in 1916 between republicans and Yuan Shikai's monarchy, Ma Anliang readied his soldiers and informed the republicans that he and the Muslims would stick to Yuan Shikai until the end.

Here, the traditionalist and Confucianist Muslim generals Ma Anliang and Ma Qi backed President Yuan. Bai Lang faced opposition from nearly everyone, from the Tibetans serving under the Gansu-allied Yang Jiqing, the Gansu and Sichuan provincial armies, ethnic Hui and Han militias and Yuan Shikai's own National Beiyang Army. Muslim Gen. Ma Qi was instructed to incite the Muslims against Bai Lang in order to get Hui and Han to join and fight him. Muslim imams preached anti-Bai announcements, claiming that Shaxide (Shahid or martyrdom) awaited those who died to fight him off. Unlike the rural areas in central and eastern China, where peasants had helped Bai's armies hide and strike out, Muslim families actively refused to support Bai's troops, even going so far as to burn themselves to death rather than deal with them. However, the Imams themselves took off and ran away after they told the Muslims to kill themselves, rather than die with them. Bai Lang's army was opposed by a mix of ethnic Han and Hui militia commanded by Ma Qi and Ma Anliang. Muslim sect leader Ma Qixi's Muslim Xidaotang repulsed and defeated Bai's bandit forces, who looted the city of Táozhōu but Muslim general Ma Anliang slaughtered Muslim sect leader Ma Qixi and his family after the war. The Muslim Generals were reported to be reactionary.

Protracted warfare and this lack of public support led to a reversal in the rebels' treatment of the population; there was an increase in acts of looting and pillage, as well as strikingly brutal massacres.

Eventually, Gen. Ma Anliang's passive defence, rather than chasing the far more agile rebel army, succeeded in wearing down Bai. The Tibetans attacked and drove Bai's army into retreat, with Ma Qixi's troops chasing them out of the Province. According to Gansu legend, Bai Lang committed suicide at Daliuzhuang, he corpse was decapitated and his head put on display. However, official Chinese documents say he vanished in Shanxi and his body was never found. Yuan Shikai ordered Bai Lang's family tombs destroyed, and had the corpses cut to pieces. Bai's headless body was left to rot.

The remnants of Bai's forces were dispersed in Hunan late 1914, with his last forces being destroyed by Yan Xishan.

== Atrocities done by Bai Lang's bandit gangs ==
Bai Lang's forces raped, killed and pillaged. The further Bai Lang and his core troops moved away from his home base of west Henan the less support he had from normal people and he was even called a gangster and ex coolie in eastern Henan by Han there and misbehaving children there were threatened with him as a boogeyman by their mothers. In Shaanxi province in areas like the Han valley, only refugees, secret society members, bandits and other marginal people joined Bai Lang' army, not ordinary Han peasants who largely repudiated him and his cause. The marginal bandit Shaanxi men he recruited allegedly held vendettas with Shaanxi Muslims who fled to Gansu that dated back to the Dungan revolt and alleged that they wanted revenge for destruction in Shaanxi during the Dungan revolt. The bandits were notable for anti-Muslim sentiment, massacring thousands of Muslims at Taozhou. Muslim Naqshbandi Khufiyya Sufi general Ma Anliang was only concerned with defending Lanzhou and his own home base in Hezhou (Linxia) in central Gansu where his followers lived and not the rival Xidaotang sect Muslims under Muslim leader Ma Qixi in southern Gansu's minor towns like Taozhou so he let Bai Lang ravage Taozhou while passively defending Lanzhou and Hezhou. The North China Herald and Reginald Farrer accused Ma Anliang of betraying his fellow Muslims by letting them get slaughtered at Taozhou. Ma Anliang then arrested Ma Qixi after falsely accusing him of striking a deal with Bai Lang and had Ma Qixi and his family slaughtered. Mass rape, looting, and killing also took place in Minzhou.

== Support from southern revolutionaries ==
Staunchly against Yuan Shikai's government, Bai developed an alliance with Dr. Sun Yat-Sen. Huang Xing, a friend of Sun, sent letters to Bai as well as weapons and ammunition. Sun hoped for further bandit uprisings in Shaanxi, calling on the population to "return to glory" like Bai Lang's gangs. Yuan Shikai's Beiyang regime knew of Bai Lang's connections with Sun Yat-Sen, but refused to make public of them for fear it would cause greater support for the rebellion.

Though Sun Yat-sen and Huang Xing promised to make him Governor of Gansu, outside of arms and supplies, Sun's influence on Bai Lang's bandit troops was minimal. Mostly uneducated, his troops could be divided between Robin Hood "freedom fighters" who believed they were taking on a corrupt regime and brigands who lived for plunder and survival.

However, when Sun Yatsen turned to the Soviets for support, and resurrected the Kuomintang in the 1920s he sharply turned against the western-style, federalist democracy he preached during this time when he was aligned with Bai Lang. He then turned to the Soviet-style single-party model, and organized the Northern Expedition without the help of bandit gangs like Bai Lang. This nationalist Kuomintang later included the Muslim warlords who Bai Lang fought against.

After another Muslim warlord, Ma Zhongying attacked and massacred the rival Muslim Xidaotang and seized their headquarters and also attacked Tibetans, Xidaotang followers fled into ethnic Tibetan populated areas of Qinghai for safety. The Xidaotang then pledged allegiance to the reformed Kuomintang in 1932 and Xidaotang leader Ma Mingren met with Kuomintang Muslim general Bai Chongxi and leader Chiang Kai-shek in 1941 in Chongqing while supplying the Kuomintang government with leather and other products while fighting against the Japanese.

== Aftermath ==
The campaign, especially the government forces' inability to crush a smaller force of bandits, greatly damaged the reputation of the Beiyang Army. This gave President Yuan who had already started to distrust the army's commanders of disloyalty, the opportunity to reorganize the Chinese military. He disempowered and then replaced Duan Qirui as head of the Beiyang Army, while raising a new army which was loyal only to him and his family. Though he managed to reduce the power of other military leaders in the short term, these policies alienated parts of the Beiyang Army from his regime, weakening it in the long run.

== Bibliography ==
- Billingsley, Phil (1988). Bandits in Republican China. Stanford, California: Stanford University Press.
- Ch'en, Jerome (1972) [1st pub. 1961]. Yuan Shih-k'ai (2nd ed.). Stanford, California: Stanford University Press. ISBN 0-8047-0789-8.
- Sheridan, James E. (1966). Chinese Warlord. The Career of Feng Yü-hsiang. Stanford, California: Stanford University Press.
