= Jingtang Jiaoyu =

Use of Chinese characters to represent Arabic

Jingtang jiaoyu (traditional Chinese: 經堂敎育; simplified Chinese: 经堂教育; pinyin: Jīng táng jiàoyù; lit. 'scripture hall education') refers to a form of Islamic education developed in China or the method of teaching it, which is the practice of using Chinese characters to represent the Arabic language. It is notable for utilizing Confucian concepts and scholarship to impart Islamic teachings and theology.

== History ==
The origins of jingtang jiaoyu date to the 16th century, when Hui scholar Hu Dengzhou returned to China after studying abroad in Central Asia and the Middle East for several years. At this phase, jingtang jiaoyu incorporated the use of authoritative Islamic texts and foreign language lessons mixed with Chinese. It also encouraged translations of Persian and Arabic texts and other religious material into literary Chinese with a Neo-Confucian style, in where the Han Kitab would later emerge from. By the end of the Ming period, the instructional system had spread throughout China. Jingtang jiaoyu would see further expansion during the transitional Ming to Qing period and many prominent Chinese Muslim scholars and thinkers arose.

== Curriculum ==
Jingtang jiaoyu is the form of Sunni Islamic education taught in Xi'an, Shaanxi, by Ahongs to Chinese Muslim students. The Quran and quranic texts are taught in this curriculum.

Jingtang Jiaoyu was founded during the era of Hu Dengzhou 1522–1597. There were 5 Persian books and the Qur'an was among 8 Arabic books which made up the "Thirteen Classics" (سابقة)

=== Arabic language ===
In jingtang jiaoyu Chinese characters are used to phonetically represent the Arabic language. Chinese sounds were used to pronounce Arabic, and it was widespread among Chinese Muslim students in the northwest province of Shaanxi, especially Xi'an. An example of this is salaam, being represented in Chinese characters as 赛俩目; sài liǎng mù. This system of Chinese characters enabled students to coarsely pronounce the Arabic language, rather than using the characters to translate the meaning.

Jingtang jiaoyuan contains elements from Classical Chinese grammar with Arabic and Persian vocabulary, along with some dialectal Chinese vocabulary, saying all of the words in Classical Chinese grammar regardless of the proper vernacular Chinese, Arabic, or Persian word order.

Jingtang jiaoyu has been severely criticized for pronouncing Arabic incorrectly, as students base their pronunciations on Chinese. Many Hui who used it said salaam aleikun instead of salaam alaikum.

The Hanafi Sunni Gedimu cling fiercely to Chinese customs and the jingtang jiaoyu method of education, using their traditional pronunciations even when learning of the standard Arabic pronunciation. Hanafi Sunni Sunnaitis (Yihewani adherents) criticize the Gedimu for practicing Islamic customs influenced by Chinese culture, including jingtang jiaoyu. Sunnaitis pride themselves on speaking "correct" Arabic, accusing the Gedimu Muslims of practicing Han and Buddhist customs and "Chinese Arabic". One Sunnaiti Imam said that the Gedimu "blindly followed the traditions of their ancestors".

== Examples ==
Arabic	Arabic romanization	Chinese	Pinyin	Xiao'erjing	English meaning
قبول	qabūl	蓋布勒	gàibùlēi	قَيْ بُ لؤِ	acceptance
نفي وإثبات	nafy wa-’ithbāt	乃非 - 伊司巴提	nǎifēi yīsībātí	نَيْ فؤِ ءِ سِ بَ تِ	denial and confirmation
سلام	salām	赛俩目	sàiliǎngmù	سَيْ لِيْا مُ	peace, salutation, concord

== See also ==
- Han Kitab
- Islam in China
- Sini (script)
- Xiao'erjing
- Aljamiado
