= Hu Songshan =

Chinese Nationalist Imam of the Yihewani sect, 1880–1955

Imam Hu Songshan
- 虎嵩山阿訇
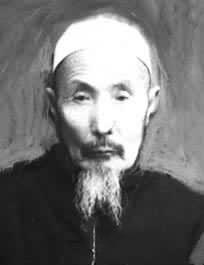
- Title: Ahong

Personal life
- Born: 1880 Tongxin County, Ningxia, Qing Dynasty
- Died: 1955 (aged 74–75) China

Religious life
- Religion: Yihewani Hanafi Sunni islam

Senior posting
- Based in: Ningxia, China
- Post: Imam and scholar of the Yihewani, scripturalist, theologian.
- Period in office: 1927–1955

Hu Songshan
- Traditional Chinese: 虎嵩山
- Simplified Chinese: 虎嵩山
Transcriptions
Standard Mandarin
- Hanyu Pinyin: Hǔ Sōngshān
other Mandarin
- Xiao'erjing: ﺧُﻮْ ﺻْﻮ شً

Hu Songshan (1880–1955), a Hui, was born in 1880, in Tongxin County, Ningxia, China. His Muslim name in Arabic was Sa'd al-Din (Arabic: سعد الدين Sa'd ad-Dīn; simplified Chinese: 赛尔敦丁; traditional Chinese: 賽爾敦丁; pinyin: sài ěr dūn dīng). Although he was born Sufi and turned Wahhabi, he changed his views and turned his back on Wahhabism after a Hajj to Makkah and later became an important imam, scripturalist, and leader of the Yihewani Muslim sect in China. He was influential and played an important role in Chinese Islam in this position as he propagated reformist and revivalist doctrines in Ningxia in his later life. Hu also played a role in rallying Muslims against the Japanese invasion of China.

== Early life and education ==
Hu's father was a Gansu ahong (imam) belonging to the Khafiya menhuan, a Chinese-style Naqshbandi Sufi order. When Hu Songshan was 18, he joined Wang Naibi of Haicheng. At age 21, he became imam of the anti-Sufi Yihewani (Ikhwan in Arabic) sect, which was founded by the Wahhabi Ma Wanfu. Hu opposed wasteful rituals and cash payments for religious services, which Sufi orders practiced. Being a member of the Yihewani, he was so against Sufism and the menhuan to the point where he destroyed his own father's gongbei (a Hui Islamic shrine centered around a Sufi master's grave) built at Tongxin.

== Life ==
He went on Hajj to Mecca in 1924 at age 45, traveling through Shanghai and he reached Mecca in 1925. When Hu was in Mecca, he did not feel solidarity with other Muslims, he experience racial discrimination given his appearance and East Asian heritage, influencing his eventual embrace of nationalism in order to rebuild a stronger China while also personally abandoning Salafism. Instead of advocating an Islamic state, he wanted Muslims to practice their religion in a strong China. He saw that Hui and Han people were treated the same and abused by foreigners. He rallied against foreign imperialism and preached Chinese nationalism and unity between all Chinese. In Wuzhong County, Ningxia, Hu was the principal of an Arabic school. Hu Songshan had changed from being a Wahhabi Salafi to a modernist and influenced the Yihewani to change its ideology along that trend. One of his followers was Muhammad Ma Jian. Another one of his followers was the Yihewani Imam Ma Fulong (d. 1970). Hu became a prominent reformist and modernist Imam and Muhammad Ma Jian studied alongside him in 1928.

Hu encouraged unity and cooperation both between Muslims in China, and between non-Muslims and Muslims in China too, using Chinese classics to advance Chinese nationalism. He studied modern science, promoted sports for his students, and permitted people to take pictures of his mosque and him, which made him stand out from less-liberal Yihewani. Hu promoted reform of traditional Islamic education as his views while a follower of the Yihewani changed.

Hu Songshan and the Hui Muslim warlord of Ningxia, General Ma Hongkui cooperated in founding several Sino-Arabic schools (中阿學校) in Ningxia to promote Chinese and Arabic language Islamic education for Chinese Muslims in the 1930s and 1940s. Hu Songshan became head of the Ningxia Private Sino- Arabic College at Dongdasi Mosque, which was founded by Ma Hongkui in Yinchuan, the capital of Ningxia province 1932. Students flocked to it from province across China after it became a public institution in the following year. Ten days prior to Ramadan's end in 1935, Ma Hongkui arranged for Chinese New Year celebrations. Hu Songshan pronounced kufr upon Ma Hongkui for this, while delivering an aggressive and fierce sermon in public. Ma Hongkui then sacked Hu from his position and exiled him. Hu then received clemency from Ma and was sent to head the Sino-Arabic Normal School in Wuzhong in 1938.

When Japan invaded China in 1937 during the Second Sino Japanese War, Hu Songshan ordered that the Chinese flag be saluted during morning prayer, along with deference to nationalism. A prayer was written by him in Arabic and Chinese which prayed for the defeat of the Japanese and support of the Chinese government. The Quran was used to justify struggling against the Japanese. Hu Songshan helped spread anti-Japanese propaganda among Muslims during the war. Unlike his teacher Ma Wanfu, a strict Wahhabi scripturalist who led the Yihewani with an anti modernist and anti Chinese culture and language ideology, Hu Songshan encouraged Muslims to study Chinese language and learn about modern sciences and education in Chinese.

Imams such as Hu Songshan led the Chinese Muslim Brotherhood (the Yihewani) to incorporate Chinese nationalism and emphasize education and independence.

The Ma clique Muslim generals Ma Fuxiang and Ma Bufang gave support to Hu Songshan.

Hu added subjects such as Chinese language and other modern subjects such as foreign sciences, mathematics and foreign languages to the Islamic curriculum and he translated Islamic texts into Chinese. Hu was close to the Kuomintang Muslim General and governor of Ningxia, Ma Hongkui, and cooperated with him. All imams in Ningxia were required to preach Chinese nationalism during prayer at the mosque during the war with Japan. Hu was active in promoting this curriculum at Sino-Arabic schools in Ningxia. Hu often reminded the Muslim masses that "If we object to natural science, then clothing, food, and shelter could not be talked about.", whenever someone challenged his introduction of modern subjects such as mathematics and science to the Islamic curriculum.

Hu also cited a hadith (聖訓), a saying of Muhammad, which says "Loving the Motherland is equivalent to loving the Faith" (traditional Chinese: 愛護祖國是屬於信仰的一部份; simplified Chinese: 爱护祖国是属于信仰的一部份; pinyin: àihù zǔguó shì shǔyú xìnyǎng de yī bùfèn) (Arabic: حب الوطن من الایمان ḥubb al-waṭan min al-imān). (Note: This was a popular Hadith circulated from the medieval era. However, the literal word-by-word sentence was deemed to be Maudhu (fake) by both classical scholars such as Muhammad ibn Is-haaq As-Saghaani, and modern scholars like Al-Albani. They deemed it to be fabricated because it was not attributed to a trustworthy authority, and lacked a sequence of narrators. See also hadith sciences.)

Hu Songshan harshly criticized those who were non patriotic and those who taught anti nationalist thinking, saying that they were fake Muslims.

== Anti-Japanese prayer written by Hu ==
Traditional

真主啊！求您援助我們的政府，使我們的國家永存，使我們的抗戰勝利，消滅我們的敵人。求您保佑我們免遭敵人侵略和殘殺的暴行。求您差遣狂風，使他們的飛機墜落，軍艦葬身大海，士兵厭戰，使他們的經濟崩潰，求您降天災懲罰他們！真主啊！求您賞准我們的祈禱！就這樣吧！

Simplified

真主啊！求您援助我们的政府，使我们的国家永存，使我们的抗战胜利，消灭我们的敌人。求您保佑我们免遭敌人侵略和残杀的暴行。求您差遣狂风，使他们的飞机坠落，军舰葬身大海，士兵厌战，使他们的经济崩溃，求您降天灾惩罚他们！真主啊！求您赏准我们的祈祷！就这样吧！

Pinyin

qídǎo cí de nèiróng rúxià ： Zhēnzhǔ ā！qiú nín yuánzhù wǒmen de zhèngfǔ, shǐ wǒmen de guójiā yǒngcún，shǐ wǒmen de kàngzhàn shènglì，xiāomiè wǒmen de dírén。qiú nín bǎoyòu wǒmen miǎnzāo dírén qīnlüè hé cánshā de bàoxíng。qiú nín chāiqiǎn kuángfēng，shǐ tāmen de fēijī zhuìluò，jūnjiàn zàng shēn dàhǎi，shìbīng yàn zhàn，shǐ tāmen de jīngjì bēngkuì，qiú nín jiàng tiānzāi chéngfá tāmen！Zhēnzhǔ ā！qiú nín shǎng zhǔn wǒmen de qídǎo！Jiù zhèyàng ba！

Arabic

بِسْمِ اللهِ الرّحْمنِ الرَّحيمِ اللّهُمَّ أَيِّدْ حُكومَتَنا وَأَيِّدْ دَوْلَتَنا وَامْطُر بِثرانا وَدَمِّرْ أَعْداءَنا وَأَعِذّنا مِنْ شَرِّ أَهْلِ الْيابان الْظالِمينَ ألَّذينَ طَغَوا في الْبِِلادِ وّقََتَلوا فينا الْعِبادَ وَأَرْسِلْ عَلَيْهِمْ عاصِفَةً تُسْقِطْ طَيّاراتهِِمْ في صَحاراهُمْ وَتَرَسِّبْ بارِجاتِهِمْ في بِحارِهِمْ وَبُعْثَرَتْ أجْنادُهُمْ وَحَرِّقْ أَمْوالَهُم وَأَنْزِلْ عَلَيْهِمْ جَزاءً يا إله الحقِّ آمين

Allāhumma ayyid ḥukūmatanā wa-ayyid dawlatanā wa-mṭur bi-tharānā wa-dammir aʻdāʼanā wa-aʻidhnā min sharri ahli al-Yābān al-ẓālimīna alladhīna ṭaghaw fī al-bilādi wa-qatalū fīnā al-ʻibāda wa-arsil ʻalayhim ʻāṣifatan tusqiṭ ṭayyārātihim fī ṣaḥārāhum wa-tarassib bārijātihim fī biḥārihim wa-buʻthirat ajnādahum wa-ḥarriq amwālahum wa-anzil ʻalayhim jazāʼan, yā Ilāha al-Ḥaqqi, āmīn.

Oh God! Help our government and nation, defeat the invaders, and exterminate our enemies. Protect us from the evil deeds done by the violent Japanese. They have occupied our cities and killed our people. Send upon them a furious wind, cause their airplanes to fall in the wilderness, and their battleships to sink in the sea! Cause their army to scatter, their economy to collapse! Give them their just reward! True God, answer our prayer! So be it/amen.

English translation by Jonathan N. Lipman from page 200 of Familiar Strangers: A History of Muslims in Northwest China.

== Family ==
Hu Songshan's son was Akhund Hu Xueliang (1918 – 1960), the subject of a violent sectarian disturbance over a jurisprudent matter. Hu Xueliang had a son, Hu Xibo.

Shaykh Sa'd al-Din Hu Songshan's grandson is Professor Shaykh Ibrahim Hu Long.
