= Haiyuan County =

Haiyuan 海原县 خَيْ‌يُوًا ثِيًا
- County
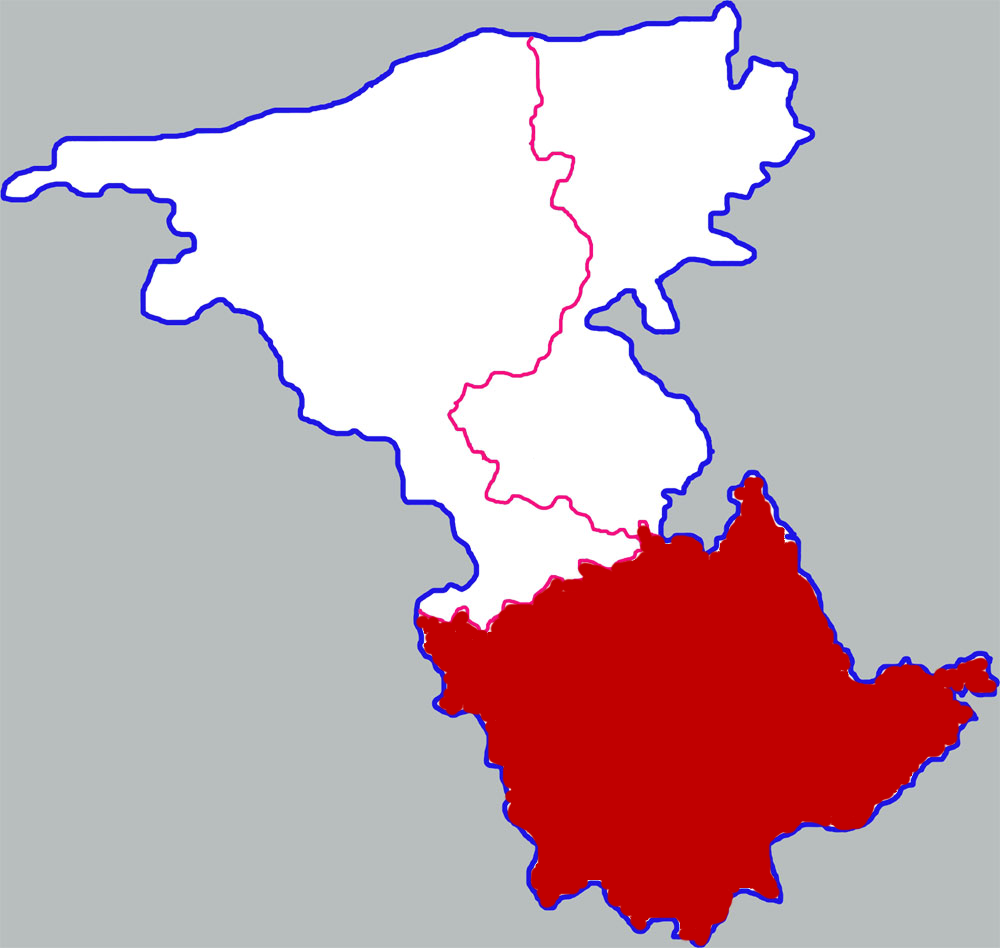
- Haiyuan in Zhongwei

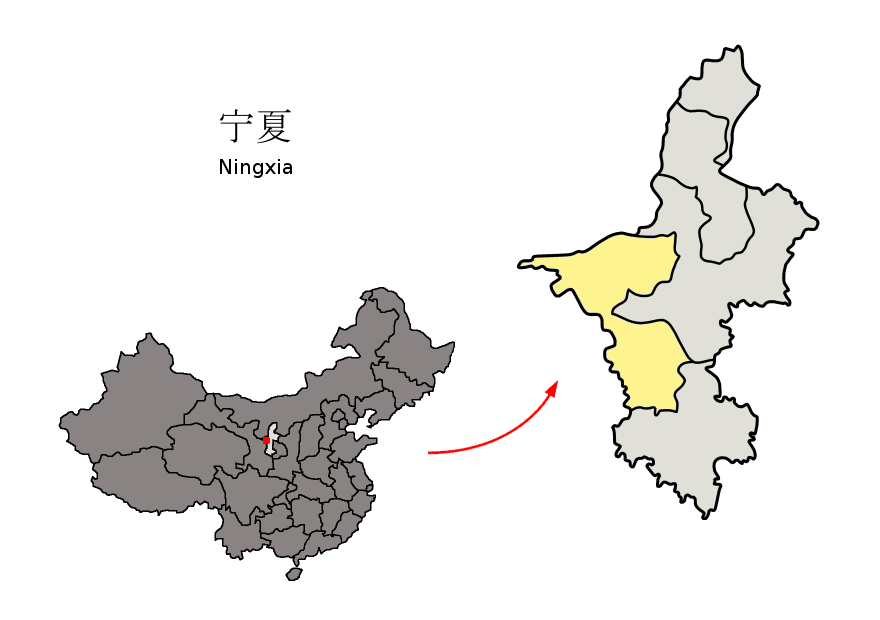
- Zhongwei in Ningxia
- Coordinates: 36°33′54″N 105°38′36″E
- Country: China
- Autonomous region: Ningxia
- Prefecture-level city: Zhongwei
- County seat: Sanhe

Area
  - County: 4,989.55 km^{2} (1,926.48 sq mi)

Population (2019)
  - County: 470,000
  - Density: 94/km^{2} (240/sq mi)
  - Rural: 78%
  - Hui: 70%
- Time zone: UTC+8 (China Standard)
- Website: www.hy.gov.cn

Haiyuan County (simplified Chinese: 海原县; traditional Chinese: 海原縣; pinyin: Hǎiyuán Xiàn; Wade–Giles: Hai-yüan Hsien, Xiao'erjing: خَيْ‌يُوًا ثِيًا) is a county under the administration of the prefecture-level city of Zhongwei in the southwest of the Ningxia Hui Autonomous Region of China. It is bordered by Gansu to the west. The county has a total area of 6,897 km^{2} (2,663 sq mi), and a population of approximately 470,000 people as of 2019. It was the site of the 1920 Haiyuan earthquake, which killed at least 200,000 people within and outside of Haiyuan.

Haiyuan County has many residents of the Hui ethnicity. They make up 70 percent of the total population. Although agricultural development is important in the county, the arid climate, high alkaline content of the soil, and the course planting kernels make it difficult to retain moisture and fertility. Due to these characteristics, farmers in the county have begun to develop organic fennel in recent years. Haiyuan is one of the poorest counties in Ningxia. The county government is located in the town of Haicheng, and the county's postal code is 751800.

== Administrative divisions ==
Haiyuan County administers 5 towns and 12 townships.

5 towns

- Sanhe (三河镇, سًاحَ جٍ)
- Qiying (七营镇, ٿِ‌يٍ جٍ)
- Xi′an (西安镇, ثِ‌اً جٍ)
- Liwang (李旺镇, لِ‌وَانْ جٍ)
- Haicheng (海城镇, خَيْ‌چٍْ جٍ)

12 townships

- Zhengqi (郑旗乡, جٍْ‌ٿِ‌ ثِيَانْ)
- Gaoya (高崖乡, قَوْيَا ثِيَانْ)
- Guanqiao (关桥乡, قُوًاٿِيَوْ ثِيَانْ)
- Shutai (树台乡, شُ‌تَيْ ثِيَانْ)
- Shidian (史店乡, شِ‌دِيًا ثِيَانْ)
- Jiaxian (贾埫乡, ڭِيَاثِيًا ثِيَانْ)
- Caowa (曹洼乡, ڞَوْوَا ثِيَانْ)
- Jiucai (九彩乡, ڭِيُوڞَيْ ثِيَانْ)
- Lijun (李俊乡, لِ‌ڭٌ ثِيَانْ)
- Hongyang (红羊乡, خْويَانْ ثِيَانْ)
- Guanzhuang (关庄乡, قُوًاجُوَانْ ثِيَانْ)
- Gancheng (甘城乡, قًاچٍْ ثِيَانْ)

== Climate ==
Climate data for Haiyuan, elevation 1,856 m (6,089 ft), (1991–2020 normals, extremes 1981–2010)
| Month | Jan | Feb | Mar | Apr | May | Jun | Jul | Aug | Sep | Oct | Nov | Dec | Year |
|---|---|---|---|---|---|---|---|---|---|---|---|---|---|
| Record high °C (°F) | 16.0 (60.8) | 20.5 (68.9) | 25.2 (77.4) | 29.8 (85.6) | 31.5 (88.7) | 32.6 (90.7) | 35.6 (96.1) | 33.9 (93.0) | 32.2 (90.0) | 25.0 (77.0) | 20.0 (68.0) | 14.0 (57.2) | 35.6 (96.1) |
| Mean daily maximum °C (°F) | 0.1 (32.2) | 3.8 (38.8) | 9.6 (49.3) | 16.2 (61.2) | 20.7 (69.3) | 24.7 (76.5) | 26.2 (79.2) | 24.5 (76.1) | 19.7 (67.5) | 14.0 (57.2) | 7.9 (46.2) | 2.0 (35.6) | 14.1 (57.4) |
| Daily mean °C (°F) | −6.2 (20.8) | −2.6 (27.3) | 3.2 (37.8) | 9.8 (49.6) | 14.7 (58.5) | 18.9 (66.0) | 20.6 (69.1) | 18.9 (66.0) | 14.0 (57.2) | 8.0 (46.4) | 1.6 (34.9) | −4.3 (24.3) | 8.0 (46.5) |
| Mean daily minimum °C (°F) | −10.5 (13.1) | −7.1 (19.2) | −1.7 (28.9) | 4.3 (39.7) | 8.9 (48.0) | 13.5 (56.3) | 15.4 (59.7) | 14.0 (57.2) | 9.6 (49.3) | 3.5 (38.3) | −2.7 (27.1) | −8.7 (16.3) | 3.2 (37.8) |
| Record low °C (°F) | −23.3 (−9.9) | −20.1 (−4.2) | −17.2 (1.0) | −9.7 (14.5) | −3.6 (25.5) | 2.6 (36.7) | 8.2 (46.8) | 6.3 (43.3) | −0.5 (31.1) | −13.5 (7.7) | −17.4 (0.7) | −25.8 (−14.4) | −25.8 (−14.4) |
| Average precipitation mm (inches) | 3.8 (0.15) | 4.6 (0.18) | 9.3 (0.37) | 19.8 (0.78) | 39.0 (1.54) | 51.1 (2.01) | 82.2 (3.24) | 91.4 (3.60) | 53.2 (2.09) | 26.5 (1.04) | 5.0 (0.20) | 2.2 (0.09) | 388.1 (15.29) |
| Average precipitation days (≥ 0.1 mm) | 3.9 | 3.7 | 4.6 | 5.6 | 7.5 | 8.8 | 10.1 | 10.3 | 10.0 | 6.9 | 3.5 | 2.0 | 76.9 |
| Average snowy days | 5.2 | 5.3 | 4.8 | 2.0 | 0.4 | 0 | 0 | 0 | 0.1 | 2.2 | 4.1 | 3.2 | 27.3 |
| Average relative humidity (%) | 50 | 48 | 44 | 40 | 43 | 49 | 59 | 63 | 65 | 59 | 50 | 48 | 52 |
| Mean monthly sunshine hours | 209.6 | 201.7 | 227.1 | 237.1 | 251.9 | 252.7 | 247.5 | 229.2 | 189.7 | 207.5 | 209.8 | 217.8 | 2,681.6 |
| Percentage possible sunshine | 68 | 65 | 61 | 60 | 57 | 58 | 56 | 55 | 52 | 60 | 69 | 73 | 61 |
Source: China Meteorological Administration

== Transport ==
- G70 Fuzhou–Yinchuan Expressway
- Provincial Expressway S40
