= Sailaifengye =

Salafi movement in China

Sailaifengye (Chinese: 赛莱菲耶) or Salafiyah refers to the Chinese Salafi Movement.

== Overview ==
Chinese Salafists are not a unified organization but "a patchwork of relatively independent mosque / prayer-congregations" loosely connected through overlapping networks of students, teachers, and Ulema from shared overseas institutions and circles of study. These congregations are mostly concentrated in Northwest China, Yunnan, and Henan and are united by the presence of charismatic religious authorities. Salafi beliefs are not just limited to the adherents of the movement; as there exist various “Salafi grey zones” among other sects like the Yihewani and the Gedimu. These “Salafi grey zones” include Chinese Muslims who have (partially or fully) accepted Salafi doctrines and/or some of its intellectual stances like opposition to shirk, bid’ah, and taqlid. However many such Muslims do not identify as "Salafi" and this could be for several reasons including:.

- A desire to remain within their sectarian tradition (like Yihewani imams and scholars who are Hanafi in madhab but are no longer Maturidi in their doctrinal beliefs).
- Fear of being ostracized or facing professional repercussions.
- Rejection of labels by the younger generations.

According to modern cultural anthropologist Leif Manger, the differences between the Sailaifengye and the Yihewwani are that the Sailaifengye are an apolitical movement focusing on the Wahhabi ideal of scriptural fundamentalism, which became an arguing point as they viewed the Yihewwani were too influenced by Chinese cultural accretions. Their strong apolitical stance cause them to discourage any subversive movement against the government. Akin to the Salafists in Saudi kingdom, the Sailaifengye in their movement rejected the militant oppositions against a state that were raised by Al-Qaeda.

Bernard Haykel surmised that the Sailaifengye rejected Taqlid on their juristic methodology. The Sailaifengye were also known for their exaltations towards the "three first generations of Islam"(Sahaba, Tabi'un, & Tabi' al-Tabi'in ), which the Sailaifengye named the collectives as "Santay" in their creed.

== History ==
The Sailaifengye movement genesis were widely known to be originated from the Chinese Muslim Hajj pilgrims.

The first known importer is Ma Debao (1867–1977), when he undertook the Hajj, was influenced by the Salafi movement in Mecca. It is reported that figures who influenced him were several persons, first was an obscure figure named "Huzhandi" an alleged disciple of Muhammad Abduh, then by a Salafist named Jialei Buhali, a native of Bukhara. Upon his return to China he began to preach the Salafi ideology. The movement criticizes innovative Islam. It opposes new movements which it believes are against the Sunnah. It opposes the influence of no-sunna Chinese culture on Islam. The sect was first imported into Hezhou of Gansu province but has now spread in many other regions, notably Ningxia, Qinghai, Yunnan, Tianjing with support of Saudi religious organizations.

Ma Debao and Ma Zhengqing promoted Salafism as the main form of Islam. But it was opposed by a number of Hui Muslim sects such as the Gedimu, Sufi Khafiya and Jahriyya, to the extent that even the fundamentalist Yihewani (Ikhwan) Chinese sect, founded by Ma Wanfu after Salafi inspiration, condemned Ma Debao and Ma Zhengqing as heretics. They were branded traitors and Wahhabi teachings were deemed as heresy by the Yihewani leaders.

The Kuomintang Yihewani General Ma Bufang, who backed the Yihewani (Ikhwan) Muslims, persecuted the Salafis and forced them into hiding. They were not allowed to move or worship openly. The Yihewani had become secular and Chinese nationalists; they considered the Salafiyya to be "heterodox" (xie jiao) and people who followed foreigners' teachings (waidao). After the Communists took power, Salafis were allowed to worship openly again.

Even among Hui Salafis and Uyghur Salafis, there is little coordination or cooperation and the two take totally different political agendas, with the Hui Salafists content to carry out their own teachings and remain politically neutral. In 2016, Los Angeles Times news reported on the rise of Salafism in China in Linxia Hui Autonomous Prefecture in area which the report said it is called “Little Mecca” by locals. The reports also said the community was largely non-political and rather conservative and rigid ideology.

== Bibliography ==
- Turki A. Al-Sudairi, Mohammed (2016). "Adhering to the Ways of Our Western Brothers; Tracing Saudi Influences on the Development of Hui Salafism in China". Sociology of Islam (SOI) - Brill: 29.
- Michael Dillon (1999). China's Muslim Hui community: migration, settlement and sects. Richmond: Curzon Press. ISBN 0-7007-1026-4.
- Rubin, Barry M. (2000). Guide to Islamist Movements. M.E. Sharpe. p. 79. ISBN 0-7656-1747-1.
- Leif Manger (2013). Muslim Diversity Local Islam in Global Contexts. Taylor & Francis. ISBN 9781136818578.
- Matthew S. Erie (2016). China and Islam The Prophet, the Party, and Law (Hardcover). Cambridge University Press. pp. 107, 109, 153, 168. ISBN 9781107053373.
