= Ma Zhu =

Chinese Muslim scholar

- 馬注

Personal life
- Born: Ma Zhu (馬注) c. 1640 Jinchi (金齒), Yongchang Fu, Yunnan, Ming China (present-day Baoshan, Yunnan, China)
- Died: after 1710
- Era: Ming dynasty, Qing dynasty
- Notable work(s): Qingzhen Zhinan (清真指南), Jingquan erji (經權二集), Chuqiao lu (樗樵錄, lost)
- Known for: Author of Qingzhen Zhinan, a major work of the Han Kitab tradition
- Other names: Yūsuf (鬱速馥), Wenbing (文炳), Zhongxiu (仲修), Zhǐnán Lǎorén (指南老人)

Religious life
- Religion: Islam
- Denomination: Sunni Islam
- Jurisprudence: Hanafi
- Creed: Maturidi
- Movement: Han Kitab

Muslim leader
- Influenced by: Wang Daiyu, Confucianism, Neo-Confucianism
- Main work: Qingzhen Zhinan (清真指南)

Ma Zhu (馬注) (1640 – after 1710) was a Chinese Hanafi-Maturidi scholar. Ma was noted for his combining of Confucian and Islamic values in his philosophy.

== Biography ==
Ma was born in Yongchang Fu in Yunnan Province during the reign of the Qing dynasty. His father died when Ma was young. He is claimed to be a descendant of Ajall Shams al-Din Omar, a Muslim Mongol general, and of Muhammad.

== Philosophy ==
Ma Zhu's philosophy focused heavily on social relations and interactions between the sexes. He theorized that, per Confucian and Islamic values, an ideal society would be one in which men dominated public affairs while women would serve in a subservient role as domestic helpmates. The philosopher opposed women performing roles outside of the home, stating "even a talented woman should not take care of non-domestic affairs". Ma took inspiration for his ideal role for women from the story of Adam and Eve, in which Allah created Eve from the flesh of Adam. This indicated to Ma that men and women were not intended to be of equal standing in society. Ma wrote:

"Husband and wife are one entity. However, created out of her husband, the wife should naturally obey him. Their love is locally described as dear as that between brothers and sisters."

— Qingzhen Zhinan (清真指南)

Ma's philosophy also denoted the distinctions between the traditional Chinese paired forces of ming (命) and xing (性), and yin and yang. According to Ma, ming represented what was preordained by Allah, while xing represented by what was acquirable though social conditioning and exposure to earthly human existence. Similarly, in Ma's view yin represented the earthly acquired and yang represented the divinely innate. Parts from both were required to form any human. Ma also believed that women should strive to be similar to famous women in Islam, he mentioned Moleyan (Maryam), Khadiyah, and Fatima as examples to follow.

Ma also advocated for both men and women to pursue an Islamic education.

== See also ==
- Wang Daiyu
- Yusuf Ma Dexin
- Liu Zhi (scholar)
- List of Hanafis
- List of Ash'aris and Maturidis
- List of Muslim theologians
