= Sanhe, Ningxia =

Sanhe 三河镇
- Town
- Location in Ningxia
- Coordinates: 36°22′41″N 106°05′13″E
- Country: People's Republic of China
- Region: Ningxia
- Prefecture-level city: Zhongwei
- County: Haiyuan
- Village-level divisions: 13 villages
- Elevation: 1,523 m (4,997 ft)
- Time zone: UTC+8 (China Standard)
- Area code: 0955

Sanhe (Chinese: 三河; pinyin: Sānhé; lit. 'three rivers'), formerly Heicheng (Chinese: 黑城; pinyin: Hēichéng; lit. 'black city'), is a town in Haiyuan County, Ningxia, China, located 45 kilometres (28 mi) southeast of the county seat, and about the same distance north-northwest of Guyuan as the crow flies. As of 2018, it has 13 villages under its administration.

== See also ==
- List of township-level divisions of Ningxia
