= Qadim (village) =

Qadim قديم
- Village
- Location within Iran
- Coordinates: 36°34′22″N 46°32′43″E
- Country: Iran
- Province: West Azerbaijan
- County: Shahin Dezh
- Bakhsh: Central
- Rural District: Mahmudabad

Population (2006)
  - Total: 208
- Time zone: UTC+3:30 (IRST)
  - Summer (DST): UTC+4:30 (IRDT)

Qadim (Persian: قديم, also Romanized as Qadīm) is a village in Mahmudabad Rural District, in the Central District of Shahin Dezh County, West Azerbaijan Province, Iran. At the 2006 census, its population was 208, in 36 families.
