= Lintan County =

Lintan County 临潭县 · བ་ཙེ་རྫོང་། Bazê
- County
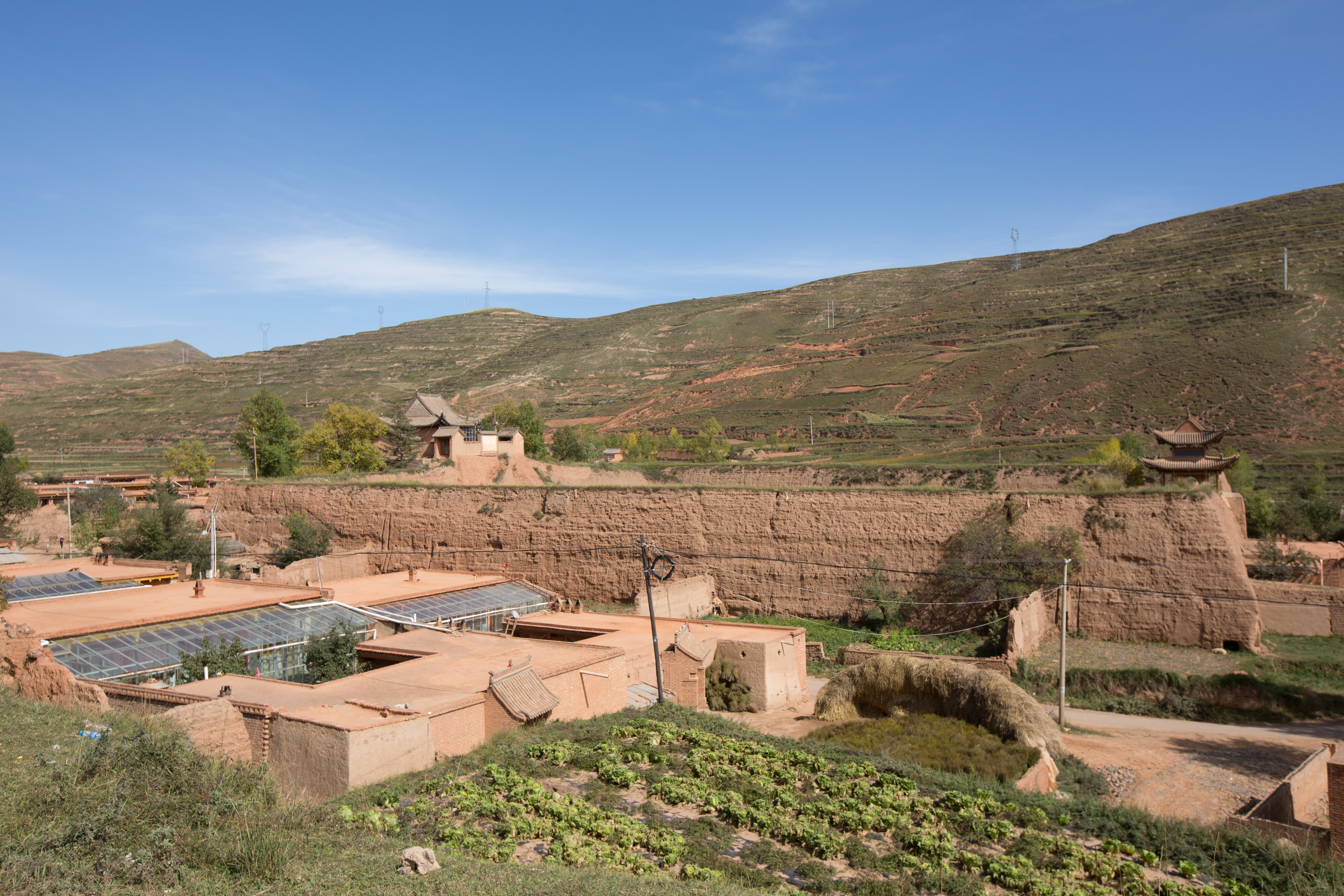
- Fort in Liushun town

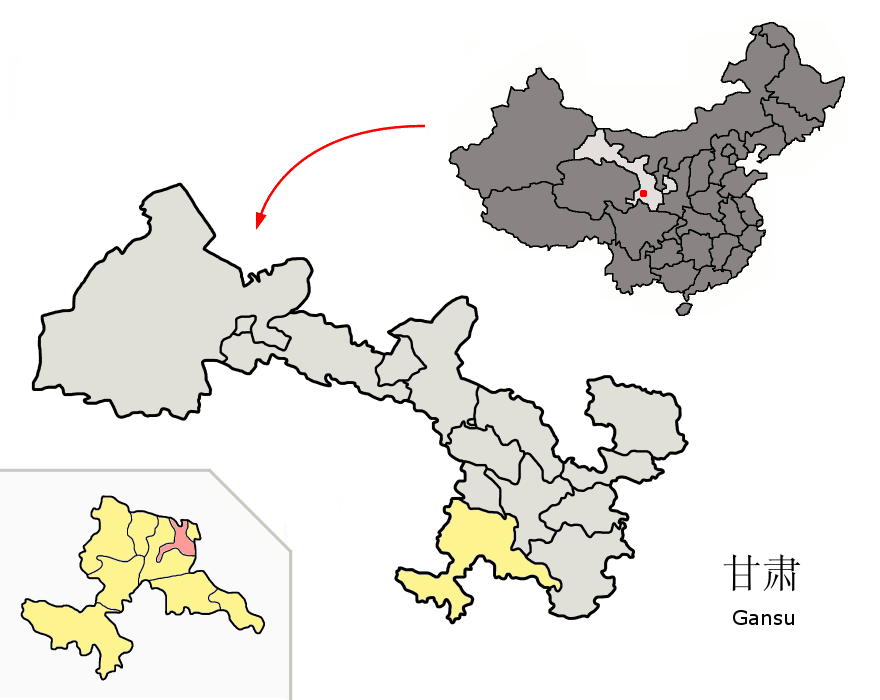
- Lintan (pink) within Gannan Prefecture (yellow) within Gansu (grey)

- Location of the seat in Gansu Lintan (China)
- Coordinates: 34°42′N 103°40′E
- Country: China
- Province: Gansu
- Autonomous prefecture: Gannan
- County seat: Chengguan (Zhacêr)

Area
  - Total: 1,557.68 km^{2} (601.42 sq mi)

Population (2020)
  - Total: 127,387
  - Density: 81.7800/km^{2} (211.809/sq mi)
- Time zone: UTC+8 (China Standard)
- Postal code: 747500
- Website: www.lintan.gov.cn

Lintan County

Chinese name
- Simplified Chinese: 临潭县
- Traditional Chinese: 臨潭縣
Transcriptions
Standard Mandarin
- Hanyu Pinyin: Líntán Xiàn

Tibetan name
- Tibetan: ལིན་ཐན་རྫོང་། or བ་ཙེ་རྫོང་། or བཱ་ཙེ་རྫོང་།
Transcriptions
- Wylie: lin than rdzong or ba tse rdzong or bā tse rdzong
- Tibetan Pinyin: Lintan Zong or Bazê Zong

Lintan County (Chinese: 临潭县, Tibetan: བ་ཙེ་རྫོང་།) is an administrative district in Gansu, China. It is one of 58 counties of Gansu. It is part of the Gannan Prefecture. Its postal code is 747500, and in 1999 its population was 148,722 people.

Tibetans of Taozhou helped crush the Muslim rebels in the Dungan revolt (1895–1896) like they did in the 1781 Jahriyya revolt. The loyalist Muslims of Táozhōu also fight against the Muslim rebels and Muslim rebel leader Ma Yonglin's entire family was executed.

Muslim sect leader Ma Qixi's Muslim Xidaotang repulsed and defeated Bai Lang's bandit forces, who looted the city of Táozhōu but Muslim general Ma Anliang slaughtered Muslim sect leader Ma Qixi and his family after the war. The bandits were notable for anti-Muslim sentiment, massacring thousands of Muslims at Taozhou. Muslim Khufiyya Sufi general Ma Anliang was only concerned with defending Lanzhou and his own home base in Hezhou (Linxia) in central Gansu where his followers lived and not the rival Xidaotang sect Muslims under Muslim leader Ma Qixi in southern Gansu's minor towns like Taozhou so he let Bai Lang ravage Taozhou and other towns in southern Gansu while passively defending Lanzhou and Hezhou. The North China Herald and Reginald Farrer accused Ma Anliang of betraying his fellow Muslims by letting them get slaighterd at Taozhou. Ma Anliang then arrested Ma Qixi after falsely accusing him of striking a deal with Bai Lang and had Ma Qixi and his family slaughtered.

== Administrative divisions ==
Lintan County is divided to 11 towns, 3 townships, and 2 ethnic townships.

| Name | Simplified Chinese | Hanyu Pinyin | Tibetan | Wylie | Administrative division code |
|---|---|---|---|---|---|
Towns
| Chengguan Town (Zhacêr) | 城关镇 | Chéngguān Zhèn | སྦྲ་མཚེར་གྲོང་རྡལ། | sbra mtsher grong rdal | 623021100 |
| Xincheng Town (Xinchên) | 新城镇 | Xīnchéng Zhèn | ཞིན་ཁྲེན་གྲོང་རྡལ། | zhin khren grong rdal | 623021101 |
| Yeliguan Town (Gonangtang) | 冶力关镇 | Yělìguān Zhèn | འགོ་ནང་ཐང་གྲོང་རྡལ། | 'go nang thang grong rdal | 623021102 |
| Yangyong Town | 羊永镇 | Yángyǒng Zhèn | གཡང་ཡོང་གྲོང་རྡལ། | g.yang yong grong rdal | 623021103 |
| Wangqi Town | 王旗镇 | Wángqí Zhèn | ཝང་ཆི་གྲོང་རྡལ། | wang chi grong rdal | 623021104 |
| Guzhan Town (Kurqên, Gurqên) | 古战镇 | Gǔzhàn Zhèn | གུར་ཆེན་གྲོང་རྡལ། | gur chen grong rdal | 623021105 |
| Taobin Town | 洮滨镇 | Táobīn Zhèn | ཐའོ་པིན་གྲོང་རྡལ། | tha'o pin grong rdal | 623021106 |
| Bajiao Town (Zhubgyo) | 八角镇 | Bājiǎo Zhèn | བསྒྲུབས་རྒྱོ་གྲོང་རྡལ། | bsgrubs rgyo grong rdal | 623021107 |
| Liushun Town (Lushün) | 流顺镇 | Liúshùn Zhèn | ལུའུ་ཧྲུན་གྲོང་རྡལ། | lu'u hrun grong rdal | 623021108 |
| Dianzi Town (Dênzi) | 店子镇 | Diànzǐ Zhèn | ཏེན་ཙི་གྲོང་རྡལ། | ten tsi grong rdal | 623021109 |
| Yangsha Town (Yangsa) | 羊沙镇 | Yángshā Zhèn | གཡང་ས་གྲོང་རྡལ། | g.yang sa grong rdal | 623021110 |
Townships
| Shubu Township (Qubotang) | 术布乡 | Shùbù Xiāng | ཆུ་བོ་ཐང་ཤང་། | chu bo thang shang | 623021200 |
| Sancha Township (Saincha) | 三岔乡 | Sānchà Xiāng | ཟན་ཁྲ་ཤང་། | zan khra shang | 623021208 |
| Shimen Township (Zhaggo) | 石门乡 | Shímén Xiāng | བྲག་སྒོ་ཤང་། | brag sgo shang | 623021210 |
Ethnic townships
| Joro Hui Ethnic Township (Zhuoluo) | 卓洛回族乡 | Zhuōluò Huízú Xiāng | ཅོག་རོ་ཧོས་རིགས་ཤང་། | cog ro hos-rigs shang | 623021202 |
| Changchuan Hui Ethnic Township (Changchoin) | 长川回族乡 | Chángchuān Huízú Xiāng | ཁྲང་ཁྲོན་ཧོས་རིགས་ཤང་། | khrang khron hos-rigs shang | 623021203 |

== Climate ==
Climate data for Lintan, elevation 2,810 m (9,220 ft), (1991–2020 normals, extremes 1981–present)
| Month | Jan | Feb | Mar | Apr | May | Jun | Jul | Aug | Sep | Oct | Nov | Dec | Year |
|---|---|---|---|---|---|---|---|---|---|---|---|---|---|
| Record high °C (°F) | 16.7 (62.1) | 19.7 (67.5) | 23.9 (75.0) | 29.4 (84.9) | 28.6 (83.5) | 27.2 (81.0) | 30.6 (87.1) | 29.7 (85.5) | 28.9 (84.0) | 22.2 (72.0) | 18.2 (64.8) | 15.5 (59.9) | 30.6 (87.1) |
| Mean daily maximum °C (°F) | 2.2 (36.0) | 4.7 (40.5) | 8.5 (47.3) | 13.1 (55.6) | 16.0 (60.8) | 18.4 (65.1) | 20.5 (68.9) | 20.4 (68.7) | 16.5 (61.7) | 11.7 (53.1) | 8.0 (46.4) | 3.8 (38.8) | 12.0 (53.6) |
| Daily mean °C (°F) | −7.4 (18.7) | −4.4 (24.1) | 0.0 (32.0) | 5.0 (41.0) | 8.7 (47.7) | 12.0 (53.6) | 14.1 (57.4) | 13.5 (56.3) | 10.0 (50.0) | 4.8 (40.6) | −0.9 (30.4) | −6.0 (21.2) | 4.1 (39.4) |
| Mean daily minimum °C (°F) | −14.4 (6.1) | −10.9 (12.4) | −5.9 (21.4) | −1.2 (29.8) | 2.9 (37.2) | 6.6 (43.9) | 9.0 (48.2) | 8.5 (47.3) | 5.7 (42.3) | 0.3 (32.5) | −6.8 (19.8) | −12.8 (9.0) | −1.6 (29.2) |
| Record low °C (°F) | −24.9 (−12.8) | −22.5 (−8.5) | −21.0 (−5.8) | −10.6 (12.9) | −8.3 (17.1) | −0.5 (31.1) | 0.6 (33.1) | 0.1 (32.2) | −4.5 (23.9) | −11.0 (12.2) | −17.3 (0.9) | −24.6 (−12.3) | −24.9 (−12.8) |
| Average precipitation mm (inches) | 4.4 (0.17) | 5.7 (0.22) | 13.6 (0.54) | 33.0 (1.30) | 68.9 (2.71) | 71.5 (2.81) | 100.9 (3.97) | 88.4 (3.48) | 73.2 (2.88) | 42.0 (1.65) | 6.6 (0.26) | 1.7 (0.07) | 509.9 (20.06) |
| Average precipitation days (≥ 0.1 mm) | 5.0 | 6.3 | 10.0 | 11.4 | 16.4 | 17.4 | 16.4 | 14.9 | 15.6 | 13.3 | 4.6 | 2.7 | 134 |
| Average snowy days | 8.4 | 9.3 | 12.2 | 8.9 | 3.1 | 0.1 | 0 | 0 | 0.4 | 6.1 | 6.9 | 5.5 | 60.9 |
| Average relative humidity (%) | 52 | 55 | 59 | 61 | 67 | 72 | 76 | 77 | 78 | 74 | 61 | 51 | 65 |
| Mean monthly sunshine hours | 207.8 | 189.3 | 203.7 | 208.4 | 207.8 | 193.5 | 207.8 | 201.0 | 153.9 | 171.4 | 202.2 | 217.5 | 2,364.3 |
| Percentage possible sunshine | 66 | 61 | 54 | 53 | 48 | 45 | 48 | 49 | 42 | 50 | 66 | 72 | 55 |
Source: China Meteorological Administration

== See also ==
- List of administrative divisions of Gansu
