= Muhammad Ma Jian =

Chinese Islamic scholar and translator

- 馬堅
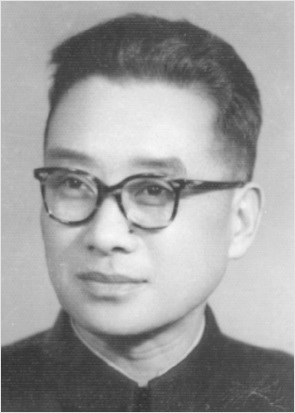

Personal life
- Born: June 6, 1906 Shadian, Gejiu, Yunnan, Qing Empire
- Died: August 16, 1978 (aged 72) Beijing, China
- Political party: Chinese Communist Party
- Main interest(s): Translation of Confucian works into Arabic, translation of Islamic texts into Chinese
- Notable idea: Compatibility between Islam and Marxism
- Notable work: Chinese translation of the Qur'an
- Education: Shanghai Islamic Normal School, Al-Azhar University
- Other names: Muḥammad Mākīn as-Ṣīnī, Makin

Religious life
- Religion: Islam
- Denomination: Sunni Islam
- Profession: Translator, academic, journalist

Muslim leader
- Teacher: Hu Songshan
- Students: Zhu Weilie

Chinese name
- Traditional Chinese: 馬堅
- Simplified Chinese: 马坚
Transcriptions
Standard Mandarin
- Hanyu Pinyin: Mǎ Jiān
- Wade–Giles: Ma Chien

Courtesy name
- Traditional Chinese: 子實
- Simplified Chinese: 子实
Transcriptions
Standard Mandarin
- Hanyu Pinyin: Zǐshí
- Wade–Giles: Tzu-shih

Muhammad Ma Jian (Chinese: 马坚; Arabic: محمد ماكين الصيني Muḥammad Mākīn as-Ṣīnī; 1906–1978) was a Hui-Chinese Islamic scholar and translator, known for translating the Qur'an into Chinese and stressing compatibility between Marxism and Islam.

== Early years ==
Ma was born in 1906 in Shadian village in Gejiu, Yunnan. This was a majority-Hui village that would later be the site of the infamous Shadian incident during China's Cultural Revolution. When Ma was six years old, he was sent to the provincial capital of Kunming, where he would receive his primary and secondary education until the age of 19. Following his graduation, Ma returned to his hometown of Shadian to teach at a Sino-Arabic primary school for two years - an experience which he did not enjoy. This was followed by a stint of study under Hu Songshan in Guyuan, a city in the Hui region of Ningxia. He then went to Shanghai for further education in 1929, where he studied at the Shanghai Islamic Normal School for two years.

== Study in Cairo ==
Following the Japanese invasion of Manchuria in 1931, Ma was sent by the Chinese government to Al-Azhar University in Cairo, Egypt, to cultivate relations with Arab nations. He was a member of the first group of government-sponsored Chinese students to study there - which included men who would later become leading Chinese scholars of Arabic and Islam, such as Na Zhong. While in Cairo, he contacted the Muslim Brotherhood-affiliated Salafi Publishing House, which agreed in 1934 to publish one of his works - the first full-length book in Arabic on the history of Islam in China. A year later, Ma translated the Analects into Arabic. Whilst in Cairo, he would also subsequently translate several of Muhammad Abduh's works into Chinese, with the assistance of Rashid Rida, as well as Husayn al-Jisr's The Truth of Islam. To promote Chinese interests in the context of the Second Sino-Japanese War, Ma was sent to Mecca in early 1939 as part of a hajj delegation alongside 27 other students - a journey on which they spoke to Ibn Saud about the determination of 'all the Chinese people' to resist the Japanese.

== Return to China ==
Ma returned to China in 1939. There he edited the Arabic-Chinese Dictionary, while translating the Qur'an and works of Islamic philosophy and history. He also became a professor of Arabic and Islamic studies at Peking University in 1946, a role in which he oversaw the introduction of the first Arabic-language courses in the Chinese higher education system. At Peking University, he would train many of the next generation's most prominent Chinese Arabists, such as Zhu Weilie. His initial translation of the Qur'an's first 8 volumes was completed in 1945, and after being rejected by Beijing publishing houses in 1948, this was published by Peking University Press a year later.

Following the Chinese Communist Party victory in the Chinese Civil War and the proclamation of the People's Republic of China, he was also elected as a member of the Chinese People's Political Consultative Conference (CPPCC) in 1949. In 1952, another edition of his Qur'an translation was published by Shanghai's Commercial Press, and Ma became one of the founders of the Islamic Association of China. As part of this role, Ma also aimed to increase public awareness of Islam - which he did by publishing several articles in newspapers such as the People's Daily and the Guangming Daily. He also published a translation of Tjitze de Boer's History of Philosophy in Islam in 1958. Due to his linguistic skills, he served as a high-level interpreter for Chinese officials such as Zhou Enlai, whom he enabled to speak to Gamal Abdel Nasser at the Bandung Conference. It was this that allowed him to keep his professorship and post in the CPPCC until his death in 1978, despite widespread persecution of Muslims during the upheaval of the Cultural Revolution. Ma's mother-in-law, sister and niece were killed during the upheavals of the Cultural Revolution but Ma was unable to voice his personal feelings on the tragedy.

Following his death, Ma's translation of Philip K. Hitti's History of the Arabs was published in 1979 by the Commercial Press. The China Social Sciences Press also posthumously printed, in 1981, his complete translation of the Qur'an, which Ma had worked on up until 1957, and then between 1976 and 1978.

== Influence ==
His translation of the Qur'an remains the most popular in China today, surpassing versions by Wang Jingzhai and Li Tiezheng. It has been lauded for its faithfulness to the original, and has reached an 'almost canonical status'. The quality of this translation has also been recognized internationally - with the Medina-based King Fahd Holy Qur'an Printing Press opting to use it for their Arabic-Chinese bilingual edition of the Quran, published in 1987.

== See also ==
- Islam in China
- Islamic socialism
- Quran translations
- Hui people
