= Haicheng Township, Heilongjiang =

Haicheng Township 海城乡
- Township
- Location in Heilongjiang Haicheng Township (China)
- Coordinates: 46°6′55″N 126°3′19″E
- Country: People's Republic of China
- Province: Heilongjiang
- Prefecture-level city: Suihua
- County-level city: Zhaodong
- Time zone: UTC+8 (China Standard)

Haicheng Township (simplified Chinese: 海城乡; traditional Chinese: 海城鄉; pinyin: Hǎichéng Xiāng) is a township under the administration of Zhaodong, Heilongjiang, China. As of 2018, it has 7 villages under its administration.
