= Haicheng, Guangdong =

Haicheng 海城镇
- Town
- Location in Guangdong
- Coordinates: 22.9632°N 115.3237°E
- Country: People's Republic of China
- Province: Guangdong
- Prefecture-level city: Shanwei
- County: Haifeng County
- Time zone: UTC+8 (China Standard)

Haicheng (Chinese: 海城; pinyin: hǎichéng) is a town under the administration of Haifeng County, Guangdong, China. As of 2018, it had 13 residential communities and 9 villages under its administration.
