= Yihewani =

Chinese Islamic sect

Yihewani (Chinese: 伊赫瓦尼; pinyin: Yīhèwǎní), or Ikhwan (Arabic: الإخوان, romanized: al-Iḫwān), (also known as al-Ikhwan al-Muslimun, which means Muslim Brotherhood, not to be confused with the Middle Eastern Muslim Brotherhood, or Ahl al-Sunni) is an Islamic sect in China. Its adherents are called Sunnaiti. It is of the Hanafi school, one of the four major schools of Sunni Islam. It is also referred to as "New Teaching" (Chinese: 新教派; pinyin: Xinjiao pai) or "Latest Teaching" (Chinese: 新新教; pinyin: Xinxinjiao). Yihewani, together with Gedimu and Xidaotang, make up the three major sects of Islam in China. In 1937, it divided into two groups.

== History ==
At the end of the 19th century and after his return from Gansu, the Dongxiang imam Ma Wanfu (1849–1934) from the village of Guoyuan in Hezhou (now the Dongxiang Autonomous County found in Linxia Hui Autonomous Prefecture) – who had studied in Mecca – founded the Yihewani movement with the "ten major Ahong" (Chinese: 十大阿訇; pinyin: shi da ahong). He claimed that rites and ceremonies not standing in line with the Quran and the Hadith should be abolished. He campaigned against grave and murshid (leader / teacher) worship and advocated for preaching and dawah in Chinese.

== Tenets ==
The follower of the sect radically opposed Qadeem's tradition which was influenced by Chinese culture. They put emphasis on the principle of "following the book and eliminating customs". Though the founder of the movement was inspired by the salafi movement, this reform movement, unlike that of the Wahhabis, did not oppose Sufism, but rather rejected the excessive veneration to Sufi masters and to their graves. They strictly follow Hanafi school of fiqh and emphasize the Ash'ari and Maturidi creeds.

== Ideology and Relationship with the State ==
In the Dungan Revolt (1895) the Yihewani backed the rebels against the Qing dynasty. However, the Muslim rebels were crushed by loyalist Muslims.

=== Repression in the Qing dynasty ===
The Khafiya Sufi General Ma Anliang, especially hated the Yihewani leader Ma Wanfu, so much that when the Han general Yang Zengxin captured Ma Wanfu, Ma Anliang arranged to have him shipped to Gansu so he could execute him. As Qing authority broke down in China, the Gedimu Sunnis and Khafiya Sufis went on a vicious campaign to murder Ma Wanfu and stamp out his Wahhabi inspired teachings. The leaders of menhuans attacked Ma Wanfu, and the Gedimu requested that the Qing governor in Lanzhou inflict punishment upon Ma Wanfu.

=== Cooperation with the Kuomintang in the Republic of China ===
Eventually, under Imams like Hu Songshan, the Yihewani was transformed from an anti assimilationist, fundamentalist brotherhood, into a modernist, Chinese nationalist sect which was supported by the Chinese Nationalist Kuomintang party, promoting modern secular education and nationalism.

The Yihewani was then backed by the Ma Clique Muslim warlords, who were members of the Chinese National People's Party (Kuomintang), which espoused Chinese nationalism, and the Three Principles of the People. It was favored over the major Sufi menhuans such as the Sufi Jahriyya, Sufi Khafiya. The Salafis were crushed by the Yihewani during this period.

The Yihewani was patronized and backed by Ma Lin (warlord) and Ma Bufang to help modernize society, education, and reform old traditions. Menhuan members such as Ma Hongbin, Ma Hongkui, and Ma Fuxiang supported the Yihewani after they saw it being patronized by Ma Qi.

Yihewani Imams reacted with hostility to Ma Debao and Ma Zhengqing, who attempted to introduce Salafism as the main form of Islam. They were branded as traitors, and Wahhabi teachings were deemed as heresy by the Yihewani leaders. Ma Debao established a Salafi order, called the Sailaifengye (Salafi) menhuan in Lanzhou and Linxia, and it is a completely separate sect than other Muslim sects in China. Sunni Muslim Hui avoid Salafis, even if they are family members, and constantly fight them.

The Kuomintang Sufi Muslim General Ma Bufang, who backed the Yihewani, persecuted the Salafi. The Yihewani forced the Salafis into hiding. They were not allowed to move or worship openly. The Yihewani had become modernist and Chinese nationalist, and they considered the Salafiyya to be "Heterodox" (xie jiao), and people who followed foreigner's teachings (waidao). Only after the Communists took over were the Salafis allowed to come out and worship openly.

=== Present day ===
The Uyghur militant organization East Turkestan Islamic Movement's magazine Islamic Turkistan has accused the Chinese "Muslim Brotherhood" (the Yihewani) of being responsible for the moderation of Hui Muslims and the lack of Hui joining jihadist groups, among other reasons.

== See also ==
- Ma Wanfu
- Ikhwan
- Menhuan
- Gongbei
- Akhund
