= Wang Daiyu =

Chinese scholar

- 王岱舆 / 王岱輿

Personal life
- Born: Ya (涯) c. 1590 Nanjing, Ming China
- Died: 1658 Beijing, Qing China
- Home town: Nanjing
- Era: Late Ming dynasty, early Qing dynasty
- Region: China
- Main interest(s): Islamic theology, Islamic philosophy, Islamic jurisprudence, Sufism, Confucianism, Neo-Confucianism
- Notable idea(s): Explaining Islamic doctrines through classical Chinese philosophical terminology, presenting Islamic theology in a Chinese intellectual context
- Notable work(s): Zhèngjiào Zhēnquán (正教真诠), Qīngzhēn Dàxué (清真大学), Xīzhēn Zhèngdá (希真正答)
- Education: Islamic studies under Ma Junshi (馬君實), Confucian classics, Chinese philosophy, Buddhist and Daoist literature
- Known for: Zhèngjiào Zhēnquán (正教真诠), contributions to the Han Kitab tradition
- Other names: Wáng Dàiyú, Wang Tai-yü, Zhenhui Laoren (真回老人), ٔوْا دَﻰْ ﻳُﻮْ (Xiao'erjing)
- Occupation: Islamic scholar, translator, author, teacher

Religious life
- Religion: Islam
- Denomination: Sunni
- Jurisprudence: Hanafi
- Creed: Maturidi
- Movement: Han Kitab
- Profession: Islamic scholar, Chinese-language Islamic author and translator

Muslim leader
- Teacher: Ma Junshi (馬君實), his father during childhood
- Influenced by: Confucianism, Neo-Confucianism, Islamic theological literature
- Influenced: Liu Zhi

Wáng Dàiyú (simplified Chinese: 王岱舆; traditional Chinese: 王岱輿; pinyin: Wáng Dàiyú; Wade–Giles: Wang Tai-yü, Xiao'erjing: ٔوْا دَﻰْ ﻳُﻮْ) (ca. 1570 - ca. 1660) was a Chinese Hanafi-Maturidi (Hui) scholar of Arab descent. His given name was Ya, style name Daiyu. He called himself Zhenhui Laoren 真回老人 ("The True Old Man of Islam") and went by his style name.

== Life ==
His earliest ancestor in the early Ming period came to China in the retinue of a Tributary Emissary from the West (the Arabian Peninsula). Because he was adept at the art of astronomy and calculating calendars, he held the office of Master Supervisor of the Imperial Observatory, and was granted a residence in Lu Fei Lane (present day South Hong Wu Street) in Nanjing.

== Philosophy ==
His descendants followed in this field. As a child, Wang Daiyu learned from his father. Later, he studied under Ma Junshi from Nanjing. At the age of 20, he began studying Chinese and an intensive investigation of the writings of Confucianism, Buddhism, Daoism, as well as other miscellaneous teachings. In the fifteenth year of the reign of the Chongzhen Emperor, he made a translation of Zhengjiao Zhenquan (正教真詮, "A True Explanation of the Right Religion"), in twenty "juan", and began the enterprise of translating the Islamic scriptures into Chinese. Later, he also wrote Qingzhen Da Xue (清真大學, "The Great learning of Islam") and Xizhen Zhengda (希真正答, "Rare and True Answers"). Within Chinese Islamic circles, he is known by the laudatory title, "Great Saint of the Qing Period." Wang believed in providing Islamic works in Chinese-language versions instead of depending upon Arabic ones.

Wang died around 1660 and was buried in the cemetery attached to Yongshou Mosque in Beijing.

== Works ==
Wang was fluent in Chinese, Persian, and Arabic. He studied Confucianism extensively and used it to explain Islam.

Wang wrote "The Real Commentary", in which he uses Chinese Classical texts to explain Islam, since Chinese speakers couldn't read original Islamic texts in other languages. He is most critical of Buddhism and Taoism, while citing Confucian ideas which agreed with Islam in order to explain it.

Wang wrote about Islam in the Chinese language and in a Confucian context, not to convert non-Muslim Chinese to Islam, but to help Muslims in China understand Islam, since the majority of them spoke Chinese at his time.

Wang also used the Chinese language and Confucianism to explain Islam to non-Muslim Han Chinese in addition to Muslims.

Wang Daiyu's works eventually became part of the Chinese Islamic text the Han Kitab, along with other Muslim scholars from eastern China like Liu Zhi, and Ma Zhu.

== See also ==
- Ma Zhu
- Yusuf Ma Dexin
- Liu Zhi (scholar)
- List of Hanafis
- List of Ash'aris and Maturidis
- List of Muslim theologians
