= Haicheng, Ningxia =

Haicheng 海城镇
- Town
- Location in Ningxia
- Coordinates: 36°33′50″N 105°38′38″E
- Country: China
- Region: Ningxia
- Prefecture-level city: Zhongwei
- County: Haiyuan
- Village-level divisions: 8 villages
- Elevation: 1,841 m (6,040 ft)
- Time zone: UTC+8 (China Standard)

Haicheng (Chinese: 海城; pinyin: Hǎichéng; lit. 'sea city') is a town in and the county seat of Haiyuan County, in the southwest of Ningxia, China. As of 2018, it has eight villages under its administration.
