= Gedimu =

Earliest school of Islam in China

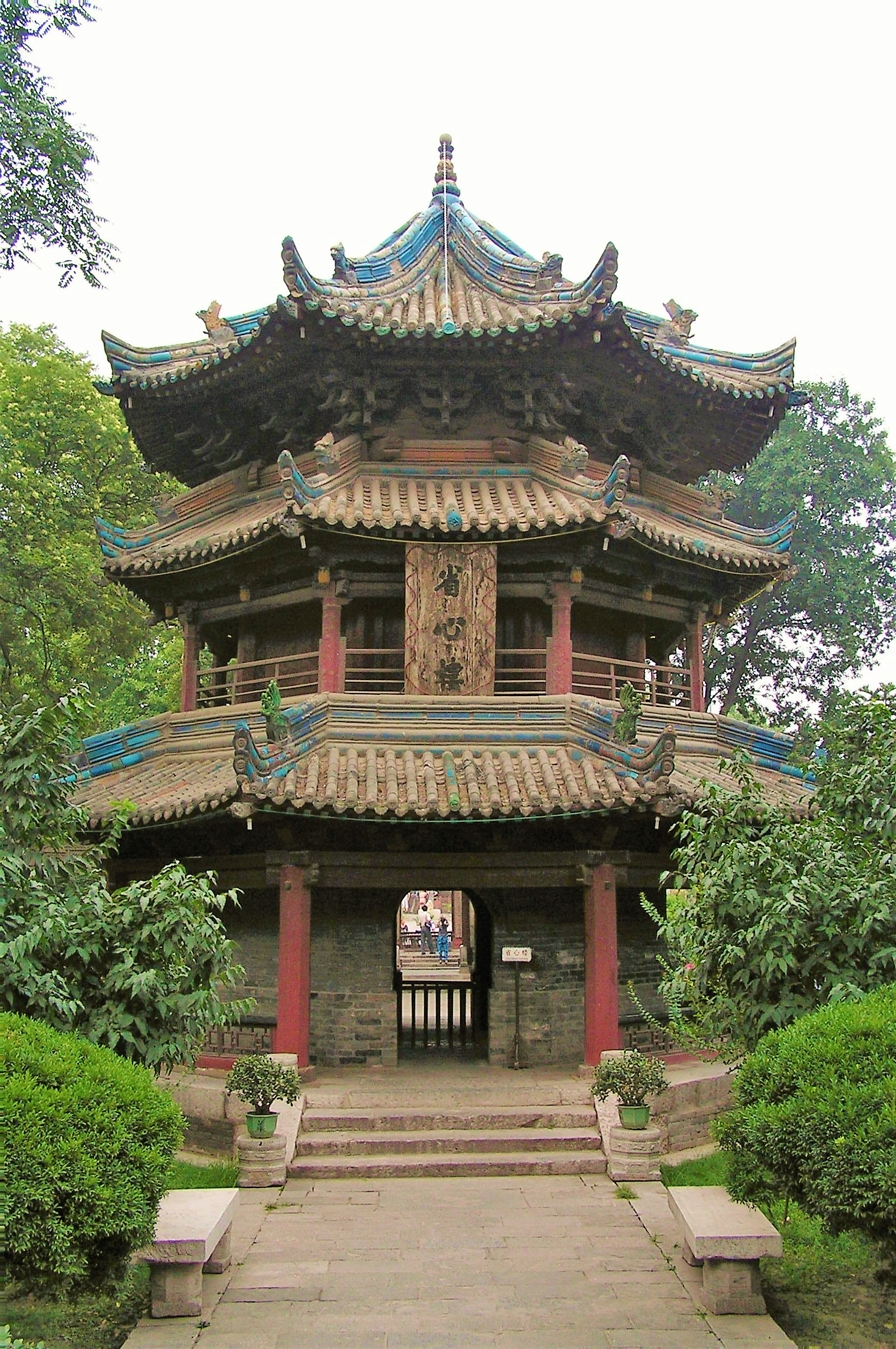
The minaret of the Great Mosque of Xi'an in the Chinese province of Shaanxi, one of the largest mosques in China.

Gedimu (Chinese: 格迪目; pinyin: Gédímù) or Qadim (Arabic: قديم, romanized: Qadīm, lit. 'Old') is the earliest school of Islam in China. It is a Hanafi, non-Sufi school of the Sunni tradition. Its supporters are centered on local mosques, which function as relatively independent units.

It is numerically the largest Hui school of thought in China.

Since the introduction of Islam in China, during the Tang dynasty, it continued to the Ming dynasty with no schisms. At the end of the Ming and early Qing dynasty, Sufism was introduced to China. Muslims in what are now Xinjiang, Gansu and Qinghai, began to convert to the Sufi sects, and the new sects were referred to as old teaching / New Faith / New Religion (Chinese xinpai or Xinjiao). Those who clung to the old beliefs were called members of the Gedimu (from Arabic قديم "qadim", meaning 'ancient'), or in Chinese Laojiao (the old doctrine).

In the religious ideas of this school the basic Islamic principles of Tawheed are maintained. In religious practice, this requires of the faithful a strict observance of the principle of Rukun, the five basic duties of Islam.

In the long period of development formed a conservative tradition. It is against unorthodox innovations and sticks to the old rules, without interference in the affairs of other denominations.

Another important feature of the school is that it puts a focus on culture and education. Organised by the mosques, they send the children from their neighborhood to receive religious instruction. Usually Arabic and Persian writings are studied.

Qadim has spread the longest history in China. In its development, the school has been somewhat influenced by Chinese culture and has many Han Chinese customs and traditions included in its rites. [5] The mosque architecture is different from that of other Muslim areas. Qadim was the result of the Sunni faith in a particular environment in the China proper.

Jingtang Jiaoyu is a form of Islamic education, influenced by Chinese culture, which the Gedimu Muslims pride themselves in learning. Jingtang Jiaoyu does not closely approximate Arabic due to the limitations of the vernacular spoken Chinese, in particular, its vowels and final consonants, it produces a sinicized pronunciation of the Arabic language. Many Hui who used it said Salaam Aleikun instead of Salaam Alaikum.

The Hanafi Sunni Gedimu has been somewhat influenced by Chinese customs and the Jingtang Jiaoyu method of education, refusing to pronounce Arabic in the Arab manner even when learning of the standard pronunciation. Hanfi Sunni Sunnaiti's (Yihewani adherents) criticize the Gedimu for practicing Islamic customs influenced by Chinese culture, including Jingtang Jiaoyu, Sunnaiti's pride themselves on speaking correct Arabic, accusing the Gedimu Muslims of practicing Han and Buddhist customs and "Chinese Arabic". One Sunnaiti Imam said of the Gedimu, "blindly followed the traditions of their ancestors".

Gedimu adherents use Mosques which are built like Chinese style temples with Minarets resembling pagodas, in contrast to Yihewani members, who build their Mosques and Minarets to resemble Middle Eastern style architecture.

== See also ==
- Jahriyya
- Khufiyya
- Chinese Islamic architecture
- Chinese Islamic cuisine
- Jingtang jiaoyu
