= Han Kitab =

Collection of Chinese texts synthesizing Islam and Confucianism

The Han Kitab (simplified Chinese: 汉克塔布; traditional Chinese: 漢克塔布; pinyin: Hàn kètǎbù; Arabic: هان کتاب) are a collection of Chinese Islamic texts, written by Chinese Muslims, which explains Islam through Confucian terminology. Its name reflects this utilization: Han is the Chinese word for the Chinese language and kitab means book in Arabic. They were written in the early 18th century during the Qing dynasty by various Chinese Muslim authors. The Han Kitab were widely read and approved of by later Chinese Muslims such as Ma Qixi, Ma Fuxiang, and Hu Songshan.

== History ==
The origins of Han Kitab literature can be traced back to the establishment of the scripture hall education (jingtang jiaoyu) system created by scholar Hu Dengzhou in the 16th century. After studying abroad in the Islamic world for several years, Hu returned to China and formed the educational system, which incorporated the use of authoritative Islamic texts and foreign language lessons mixed with Chinese. Initially the Han Kitab was composed of Chinese translations of Sufi texts and other religious material originally written in Persian or Arabic. Around the mid-17th century, Chinese Muslim scholars began writing original texts that synthesized Islamic and Classical Chinese thought. Within a few generations, the instructional system spread throughout China, and subsequent scholars began writing Islamic literature within a Chinese cultural context.

=== 21st century ===
In July 2023, the United Front Work Department's Central Institute of Socialism developed a plan to "meld Islam with Confucianism" using the Han Kitab texts as a guide.

== Authorship ==
Liu Zhi wrote his Han Kitab in Nanjing in the early 18th century. The works of Wu Zunqie, Zhang Zhong, and Wang Daiyu were also included in the Han Kitab.

== Bibliography ==
- Dillon, Michael (1999). China's Muslim Hui community: migration, settlement and sects. Richmond: Curzon Press. ISBN 0-7007-1026-4. Archived from the original on 2023-09-16.
- Lipman, Jonathan Neaman (2004). Familiar strangers: a history of Muslims in Northwest China. Seattle: University of Washington Press. ISBN 0-295-97644-6. Archived from the original on 2023-09-16.
