= Liu Zhi (scholar) =

Chinese Scholar

- 劉智 / 刘智
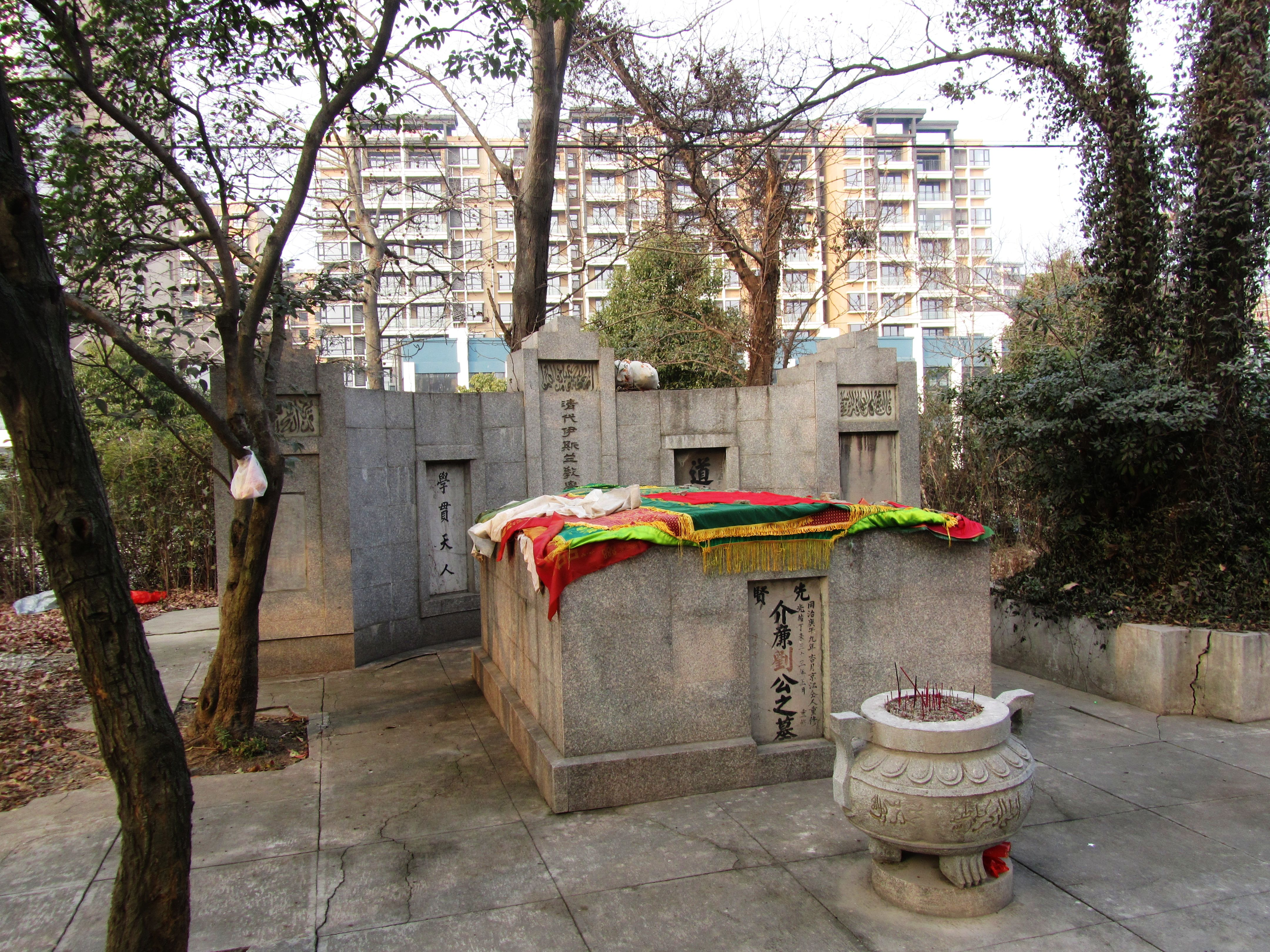
- Tomb of Liu Zhi in Yuhuatai District, Nanjing

Personal life
- Born: Liu Zhi (劉智) c. 1660 Nanjing, Qing China
- Died: After 1724
- Resting place: Tomb of Liu Zhi, Yuhuatai District, Nanjing, China
- Home town: Nanjing
- Era: 17th–18th centuries
- Region: China
- Main interest(s): Islamic theology, Islamic law, metaphysics, Confucianism, Neo-Confucianism, the life of Muhammad
- Notable idea(s): Explaining Islamic theology, law and prophetic history through Classical Chinese and Neo-Confucian terminology
- Notable work(s): Tianfang Xingli (天方性理), Tianfang Dianli (天方典禮), Tianfang Zhisheng Shilu (天方至聖實錄), Zhenjing Zhaowei (真境昭微), Tianfang Zimu Jieyi (天方字母解義), Tianfang Sanzijing (天方三字經), Huihui Shuo (回回說)
- Education: Islamic studies, Arabic and Persian literature, the Confucian classics, Chinese philosophy, Buddhist and Daoist scriptures
- Known for: Major author of the Han Kitab tradition, the synthesis of Chinese and Islamic intellectual traditions
- Other names: Liu Chih, Jielian (介廉, courtesy name), Yizhai (一齋 / 一斋, literary name), ﻟِﯿَﻮْ جِ (Xiao'erjing)
- Occupation: Islamic scholar, Theologian, Philosopher, author, translator

Religious life
- Religion: Islam
- Denomination: Sunni
- School: Huiru (Muslim Confucian tradition)
- Jurisprudence: Hanafi
- Creed: Maturidi
- Movement: Han Kitab

Muslim leader
- Teacher: Liu Sanjie (劉三杰), Yuan Ruqi (袁汝契)
- Influenced by: Zhu Xi, Ibn Arabi, Abd al-Rahman Jami, Najm al-Din Razi, Aziz al-Nasafi

Liu Zhi (Xiao'erjing: ﻟِﯿَﻮْ جِ, ca. 1660 – ca. 1739), or Liu Chih, was a Chinese Sunni Hanafi-Maturidi scholar of the Qing dynasty, belonging to the Huiru (Muslim) school of Neoconfucian thought. He was the most prominent of the Han Kitab writers who attempted to explain Muslim thought in the Chinese intellectual climate for a Hui Chinese audience, by frequently borrowing terminologies from Buddhism, Taoism and most prominently Neoconfucianism and aligning them with Islamic concepts. He was from the city of Nanjing. His magnum opus, Tianfang Xingli or 'Nature and Principle in the Direction of Heaven', was considered the authoritative exposition of Islamic beliefs and has been republished twenty-five times between 1760 and 1939, and is often referred to by Muslims writing in Chinese.

== Biography ==
Liu Zhi was born into a scholarly family around 1660. In his childhood, he received instruction from his father, Liu Sanjie (劉三杰). At the age of 12, he studied scriptures with Yuan Ruqi (袁汝契) at the Garden of Military Studies Mosque in Nanjing, (which no longer exists). At the age of 15, he began a career of study in his home: for fifteen years, he studied Confucianism, Buddhism, Daoism and "Western Studies." He considered Confucius and Mencius to be "Sages of the East" and Muhammad to be a "Sage of the West," and that "the teachings of the Sages of East and West, today as in ancient times, are one." He further believed that the scriptures of Islam are also "generally similar to the intentions of Confucius and Mencius." From around the age of 30, he took up residence at the foot of Qingliangshan in Nanjing, where he began to interpret and expound on the Islamic scriptures, using Confucian studies, for a period of about twenty years. During this time, he twice brought his manuscript with him to visit and solicit advice and the opinions of both Muslims and non-Muslims, leaving his tracks throughout Jiangsu, Shandong, Hebei, Henan, Anhui, Zhejiang, Guangdong, and other places. In his later years, he resided at his studio, Saoyelou ("House of Sweeping Leaves"), at Qingliangshan in Nanjing.

He learned Arabic and Persian, and studied both Buddhism and Daoism. He also wrote several works on Islam in 1674, 1710, and 1721.

His writings became part of the Han Kitab, a collection of literature which synthesized Islam and Confucianism.

He said that Muslims were allowed to believe in the Mandate of Heaven and serve the Emperor, because Allah allowed the Mandate of Heaven to exist.

After Liu Zhi's death, his tomb became a site of pilgrimage for Chinese Muslims, with thousands visiting his tomb annually.

== Works ==
- 天方性理 (Tianfang Xingli, The Metaphysics of Islam or The Philosophy of Arabia). Šarḥ al-laṭā'if (شرح اللطائف) was the Arabic translation by Ma Lianyuan (馬聯元 and محمد نور الحق ابن لقمان الصيني, 1841-1903)
- 天方典禮 (Tianfang Dianli, The Rites of Islam)
- 天方字母解義 (Tiānfāng zìmǔ jiě yì, Arabic Script explanation meaning) T'ien fang tse mu kieh i
- 天方至聖實綠 (Tianfang Zhisheng Shilu, The Real Record of the Last Prophet of Islam) In 1921 it was translated into English by Royal Asiatic Society member Isaac Mason as "The Arabian Prophet: A Life of Mohammad from Chinese Sources".
- 五功釋義 (Wǔgōng shìyì The Exposition of the Five Pillars of Islam) An influential treatise, regarded as a basic textbook on the five "pillars" of Islam (arkān al-islām).

== See also ==
- Wang Daiyu, Chinese Islamic scholar, considered the first Han Kitab writer.
- Yusuf Ma Dexin, a later Chinese Islamic philosopher and reformist.
- Ma Zhu
- List of Hanafis
- List of Ash'aris and Maturidis
- List of Muslim theologians
