= History of Islam in China =

The history of Islam in China dates back to 1,300 years ago. Currently, Chinese Muslims are a minority group in China, representing between 0.45% to 1.8% of the total population according to the latest estimates. Although Hui Muslims are the most numerous group, the greatest concentration of Chinese Muslims are located in Northwestern China, mostly in the autonomous region of Xinjiang, which holds a significant Uyghur population. Lesser but significant Chinese Muslim populations reside in the regions of Ningxia, Gansu, and Qinghai. Of China's 55 officially recognized minority peoples, ten groups are predominantly Sunnī Muslim.

== Origin of Islam in China ==
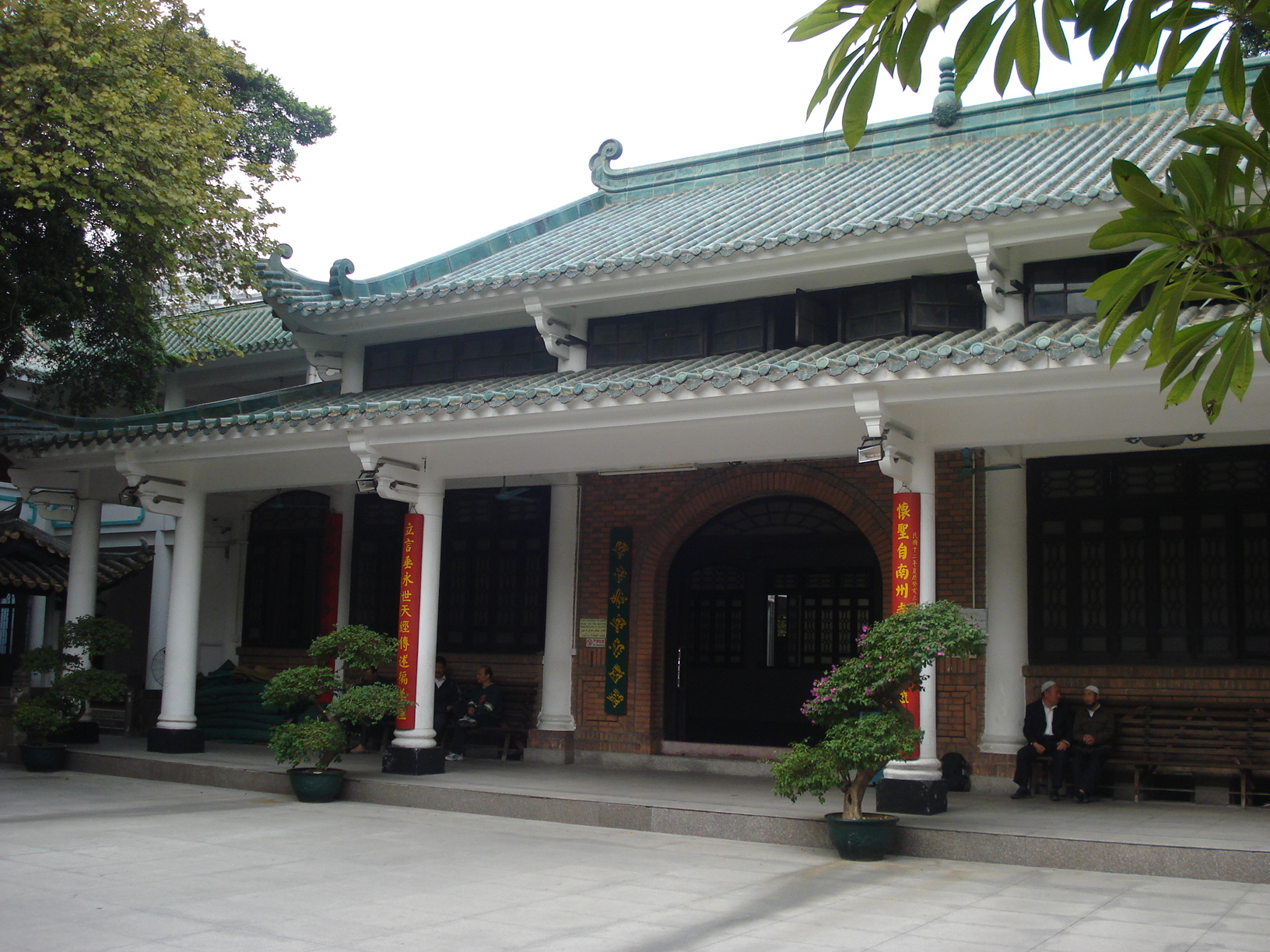
The Huaisheng Mosque is one of the oldest mosques in the world, traditionally believed to have been built by Saʿd ibn Abī Waḳḳāṣ.

The history of Islam in China goes back to the earliest years of Islam. According to Chinese Muslims' traditional accounts, Muslim missionaries reached China through an embassy sent by ʿUthmān ibn ʿAffān (644–656 CE), the third rāshidūn caliph, in 651 CE, less than twenty years after the death of Muhammad (632 CE). Saʿd ibn Abī Waḳḳāṣ, the maternal uncle and second cousin of Muhammad, was sent with a delegation to meet the Chinese Gaozong Emperor. The construction of Huaisheng Mosque in Guangzhou, the first mosque in the country, is attributed to him.

According to traditional Chinese Muslim legendary accounts, the history of Islam in China began when four companions of Muhammad (Ṣaḥābā)—Saʿd ibn Abī Waḳḳāṣ (594–674 CE), Jaʿfar ibn Abī Ṭālib, Jaḥsh ibn Riyāb, and another one sailed from the shores of the Aksumite Empire in 615–616 CE, reached ancient China by sea and preached there from 616 to 617 onwards, after their arrival following the Chittagong-Kamrup-Manipur route. Saʿd ibn Abī Waḳḳāṣ again headed for China for the third time in 650–651 CE, after ʿUthmān ibn ʿAffān (644–656), the third rāshidūn caliph, sent him with an embassy in 651 CE, which the Chinese Emperor received warmly.

=== China-Arab trade relations ===
Trade existed between pre-Islamic Arabia and South China, and flourished when Arab maritime traders converted to Islam. It reached its peak under the Mongol-led Yuan dynasty. Muslims in China have managed to practice their faith in China, sometimes against great odds, since the 7th century CE. Islam is one of the religions that is still officially recognized in China.

China's long and interactive relationship with the various tribes and empires of the Eurasian Steppe through diplomacy, trade, war, subordination, and/or domination paved the way for a large sustained Muslim community within China. Islamic influence came from the various steppe peoples who assimilated into the predominant Han-Chinese culture. Muslims who were transferred to China from Persia and Central Asia to administer the empire served as administrators, generals, and in other leadership positions.

=== History ===
Emperor Gaozong, the Tang emperor who received the envoy ordered the construction of the Huaisheng Mosque in Guangzhou, the first mosque built in the country, in memory of Muhammad. Hui legends seem to confuse the 651 visit of Waḳḳāṣ with the introduction of Islam as early as 616–617 by earlier visits of the four companions of Muhammad (Ṣaḥābā).

While modern historians state that there is no evidence for Waḳḳāṣ himself ever coming to China, they do believe that Muslim diplomats and merchants arrived to Tang China within a few decades from the beginning of the Muslim era. The Tang dynasty's cosmopolitan culture, with its intensive contacts spread across Central Asia and its significant communities of (originally Non-Muslim) Central and Western Asian merchants resident in Chinese cities, which helped the introduction of Islam. The first major Muslim settlements in China consisted of Arab and Persian merchants.

== Tang dynasty ==
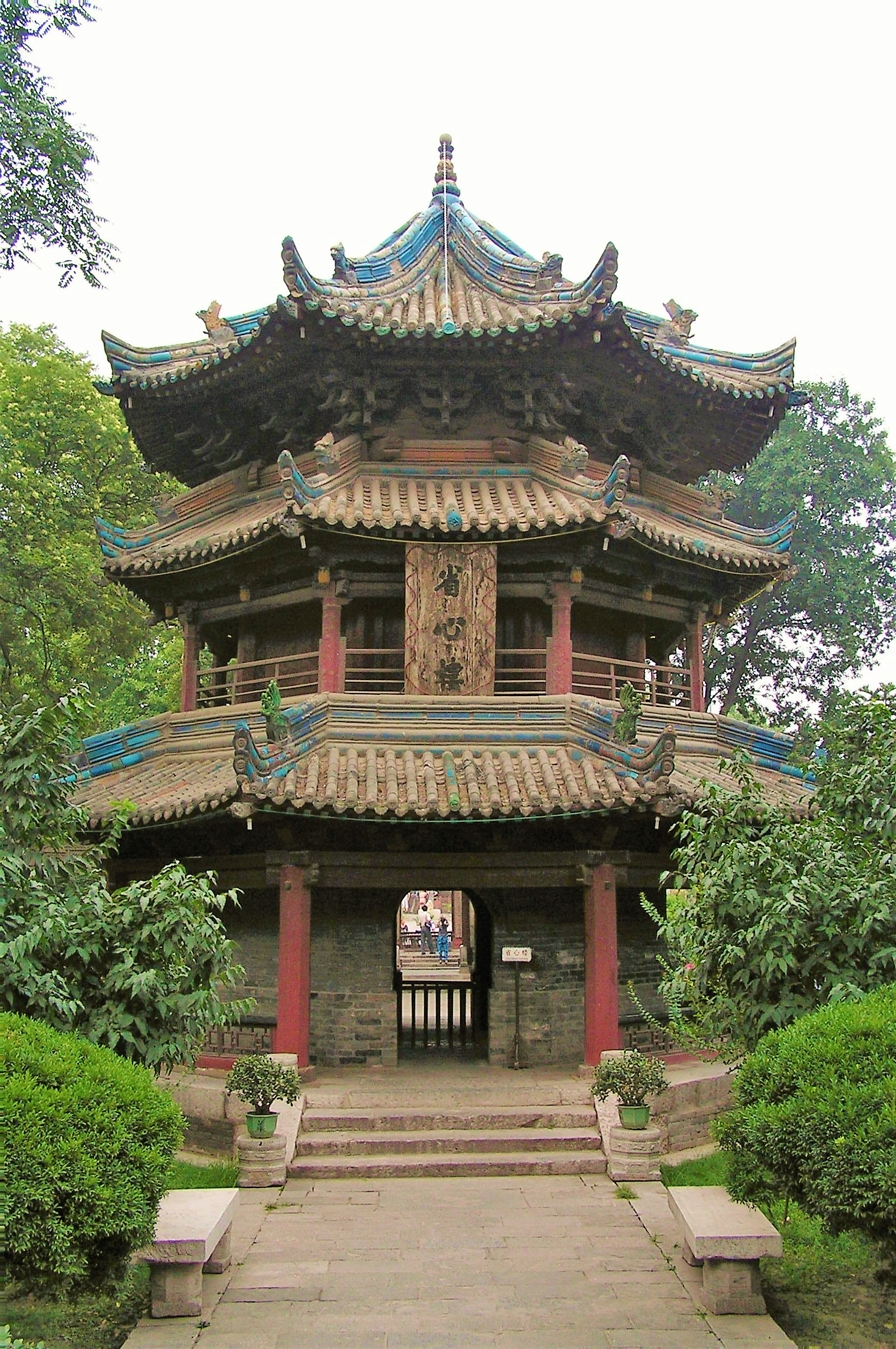
The Great Mosque of Xi'an, one of the oldest mosques in China

Arab people are first noted in Chinese written records, under the name Ta shi in the annals of the Tang dynasty (618–907) (Ta shi or Da shi is the Chinese rendering of Tazi—the name the Persian people used for the Arabs). Records dating from 713 speak of the arrival of a Da shi ambassador. The first major Muslim settlements in China consisted of Arab and Persian merchants.

The first encounter between the Tang Chinese and the Umayyad Arabs occurred in 715 AD when Ikhshid, the king of Fergana Valley, was deposed with the help of the Arabs of the Umayyad Caliphate and a new king Alutar was installed on the throne. The deposed king fled to Kucha (seat of Anxi Protectorate), and sought Chinese intervention. The Chinese sent 10,000 troops under Zhang Xiaosong to Ferghana. He defeated Alutar and the Arab occupation force at Namangan and reinstalled Ikhshid on the throne. In 717 AD the Arabs attacked Transoxiana again hoping to capture the Tang dynasty's Four Garrisons of Anxi district. The Arabs were again routed in the Battle of Aksu. Subsequently, with Chinese backing, the Turgesh launched punitive attacks into Arab territory eventually wresting all of Ferghana from the Arabs with the exception of a few forts.

Despite conflict between the Tang and the Abbasids during the Battle of Talas in 751, relations between the two states improved soon after. In 756, a contingent probably consisting of Persians and Iraqis was sent to Gansu to help Emperor Xuanzong in his struggle against the An Lushan Rebellion. Less than 50 years later, an alliance was concluded between the Tang and the Abbasids against Tibetan attacks in Central Asia. A mission from the Caliph Harun al-Rashid (766–809) arrived at Chang'an.

It is recorded that in 758, a large Muslim settlement in Guangzhou erupted in unrest and the people fled. The community had constructed a large mosque (Huaisheng Mosque), destroyed by fire in 1314, and constructed in 1349–51; only ruins of a tower remain from the first building.

During the Tang dynasty, a steady stream of Arab (Ta'shi) and Persian (Po'si) traders arrived in China through the silk road and the overseas route through the port of Quanzhou. Not all of the immigrants were Muslims, but many of those who stayed formed the basis of the Chinese Muslim population and the Hui ethnic group. The Persian immigrants introduced polo, their cuisine, their musical instruments, and their knowledge of medicine to China.

== Song dynasty ==
Many Muslims went to China to trade, and these Muslims began to have a great economic impact and influence on the country. During the Song dynasty (960–1279), Muslims in China dominated foreign trade and the import/export industry to the south and west.

In year 1070, the Song emperor, Shen-tsung (Shenzong) invited 5,300 Muslims from Bukhara, to settle in China. The emperor used these men in his campaign against the Liao empire in the northeast. Later on these Muslims were settled between the Song capital of Kaifeng and Yenching (modern-day Beijing). The object was to create a buffer zone between the Chinese and the Liao. In 1080, 10,000 Arab men and women migrated to China on horseback and settled in all of the provinces of the north and north-east. The Arabs from Bukhara were under the leadership of Prince Amir Sayyid "So-fei-er" (his Chinese name). The prince was later given an honorary title. He is reputed of being the "father" of the Muslim community in China. Prior to him Islam was named by the Tang and Song Chinese as Dashi fa ("law of the Arabs") (Tashi or Dashi is the Chinese rendering of Tazi—the name the Persian people used for the Arabs). . He renamed it to Huihui Jiao ("the Religion of the Huihui").

The Chinese materia medica 52 (re-published in 1968–75) was revised under the Song dynasty in 1056 and 1107 to include material, particularly 200 medicines, taken from Ibn Sina's The Canon of Medicine.

Pu Shougeng, a Muslim foreign trader, stands out in his work to help the Yuan conquer Southern China, the last outpost of Song power. In 1276, Song loyalists launched a resistance to Mongol efforts to take over Fuzhou. The Yuanshih (Yuan dynasty official history) records that Pu Shougeng "abandoned the Song cause and rejected the emperor...by the end of the year, Quanzhou submitted to the Mongols."In abandoning the Song cause, Pu Shougeng mobilized troops from the community of foreign residents, who massacred the Song emperor's relatives and Song loyalists.Pu Shougeng and his troops acted without the help of the Mongol army. Pu Shougeng himself was lavishly rewarded by the Mongols. He was appointed military commissioner for Fujian and Guangdong

== Yuan dynasty ==
The Yuan dynasty of China continued to maintain an excellent relationship with other nomadic tribes on the Mongolian Plateau. The ethnic Mongol emperors of the Yuan dynasty elevated the status of foreigners of all religions versus the Han, Khitan, and Jurchen, and placed many foreigners such as Muslim Persians and Arabs, Turkic Christians, Jews, Tibetan Buddhist Lamas, and Buddhist Turpan Uyghurs in high-ranking posts instead of native Confucian scholars, using many Muslims in the administration of China. The territory of the Yuan was administered in 12 districts during the reign of Kublai Khan with a governor and vice-governor each. According to Iranian historian Rashidu'd-Din Fadlu'llah, of these 12 governors, 8 were Muslims; in the remaining districts, Muslims were vice-governors.

At the same time the Mongols imported Central Asian Muslims to serve as administrators in China, the Mongols also sent ethnic Han and Khitans from China to serve as administrators over the Muslim population in Bukhara in Central Asia, using foreigners to curtail the power of the local peoples of both lands.

The state forced massive numbers of Central Asian Muslims to move into China during the Yuan dynasty. In the 14th century, the total population of Muslims was 4,000,000. It was during this time that Jamal ad-Din, a Persian astronomer, presented Kublai Khan with seven Persian astronomical instruments. Also, The Muslim architect Yeheidie'erding (Amir al-Din) learned from Han architecture and helped to design and construct the capital of the Yuan dynasty, Dadu, otherwise known as Khanbaliq or Khanbaligh.

In the mid-14th century, the Ispah Rebellion against the Yuan dynasty led by Chinese Persian Muslims broke out in South Fujian. After the rebellion was suppressed, the local Han people in Quanzhou turned against the Semu people and great misery was brought upon Muslim population. Quanzhou itself ceased to be a leading international seaport.

Genghis Khan and the following Yuan emperors forbade Islamic practices like Halal butchering, forcing Mongol methods of butchering animals (similar to Jhatka, and believed by Buddhists to induce less suffering) on Muslims, and other restrictive degrees continued. Muslims had to slaughter sheep in secret. Genghis Khan directly called Muslims and Jews "slaves", and demanded that they follow the Mongol method of eating rather than the halal method. Circumcision was also forbidden. Jews were also affected, and forbidden by the Mongols to eat Kosher. Toward the end, corruption and the persecution became so severe that Muslim generals joined the Han people in rebelling against the Mongol-led Yuan dynasty. The Ming founder Zhu Yuanzhang had Muslim generals like Lan Yu who rebelled against the Mongols and defeated them in combat. Some Muslim communities had the name in Chinese which meant "barracks" and also mean "thanks", many Hui Muslims claim it is because that they played an important role in overthrowing the Yuan dynasty and it was named in honor of the Han people who assisted them.

Dadu would last until 1368 when Zhu Yuanzhang, the founder of the Ming dynasty and future Hongwu Emperor, made his imperial ambitions known by sending an army toward the Yuan capital. The last Yuan emperor fled north to Shangdu and Zhu ordered the destruction of Yuan palaces. Dadu was renamed Beiping by the Ming in the same year.

== Ming dynasty ==
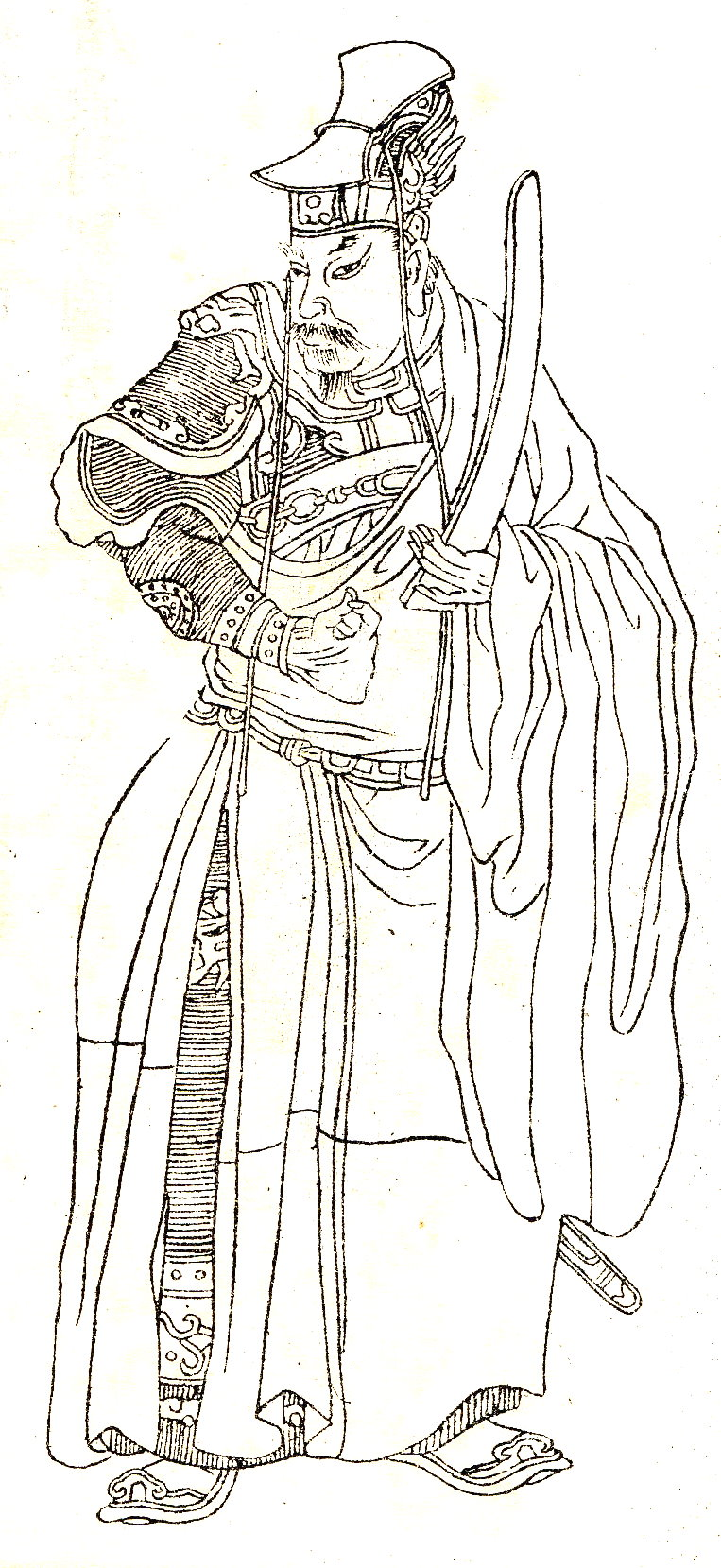
Chang Yuchun was a Muslim Ming dynasty general who greatly contributed to overthrowing Mongol rule.

Muslims continued to flourish in China during the Ming dynasty. During Ming rule, the capital, Nanjing, was a center of Islamic learning. The Ming dynasty saw the rapid decline in the Muslim population in the sea ports. This was due to the closing of all seaport trade with the outside world. However it also saw the appointment of Muslim military generals such as Mu Ying who campaigned in Yunnan and central Shandong. These two areas became leading centers of Islamic learning in China. The emperor Zhu Yuanzhang was the founder of the Ming dynasty. Many of his most trusted commanders were Muslims, including Hu Dahai, Mu Ying, Lan Yu, Feng Sheng and Ding Dexing. The Ming dynasty also gave rise to the famous Muslim explorer Zheng He.

Muslims in Ming dynasty Beijing were given relative freedom by the Chinese, with no restrictions placed on their religious practices or freedom of worship, and being normal citizens in Beijing. In contrast to the freedom granted to Muslims, followers of Tibetan Buddhism and Catholicism suffered from restrictions and censure in Beijing.

=== Integration ===
Immigration slowed down drastically, however, and the Muslims in China became increasingly isolated from the rest of the Islamic world, gradually becoming more sinicized, adopting the Chinese language and Chinese dress. During this period, Muslims also began to adopt Chinese surnames. Other Muslims, who could not find a Chinese surname similar to their own, adopted the Chinese character most similar to their own – Ma (馬) for Muhammad, Mai for Mustafa, Mu for Masoud, Ha for Hasan, Hu for Hussain and Sa'I for Said and so on. The Hui, Salar, and Dongxiang are Muslims in China who use Chinese surnames. As a result, the Muslims became "outwardly indistinguishable" from the Chinese.

In addition to names, Muslim customs of dress and food also underwent a synthesis with Chinese culture.The Islamic modes of dress and dietary rules were maintained within a Chinese cultural framework. In time, the immigrant Muslims began to speak local dialects and to read in Chinese.

== Qing dynasty ==
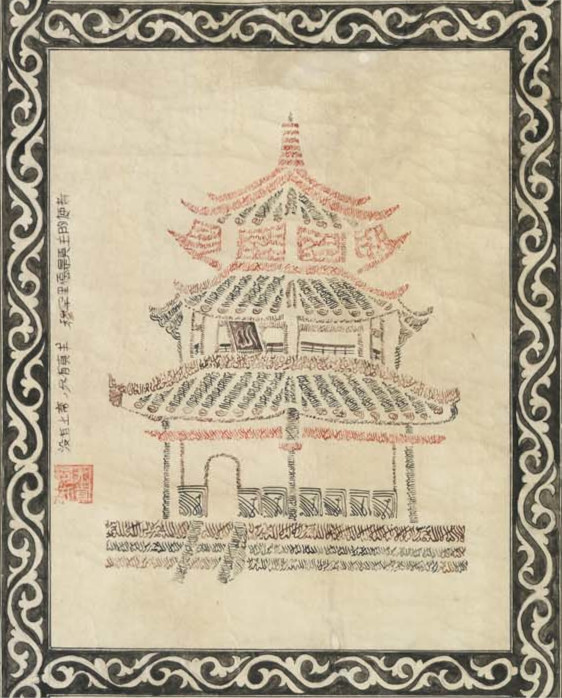
Pagoda composed of the Shahada and other Islamic prayers; section of an 1845 scroll

In the Manchu-led Qing dynasty, Muslims had many mosques in the large cities, with particularly important ones in Beijing, Xi'an, Hangzhou, Guangzhou, and other places (in addition to those in the western Muslim regions). The architecture typically employed traditional Chinese styles, with Arabic-language inscriptions being the chief distinguishing feature. Many Muslims held government positions, including positions of importance, particularly in the army. As travel became easier, there were many exchanges between China and the outside world. Around this time, Chinese Muslims also became the first Muslims in New Zealand (See Islam in New Zealand). Sufism spread throughout the Northwestern China in the early decades of the Qing dynasty (mid-17th century through early 18th century). The most important Sufi orders (menhuan) included:

- The Qadiriyya, which was established in China Qi Jingyi (祁静一), also known as Hilal al-Din (1656–1719), student of the famous Central Asian Sufi teachers, Khoja Afaq and Kjoja Abd Alla. He was known among the Hui Sufis as Qi Daozu (Grand Master Qi). The shrine complex around "great tomb" (da gongbei) in Linxia remains the center of the Qadiriyya in China.
- The Khufiyya: a Naqshbandi order.
- The Jahriyya: another Naqshbandi menhuan, founded by Ma Mingxin.

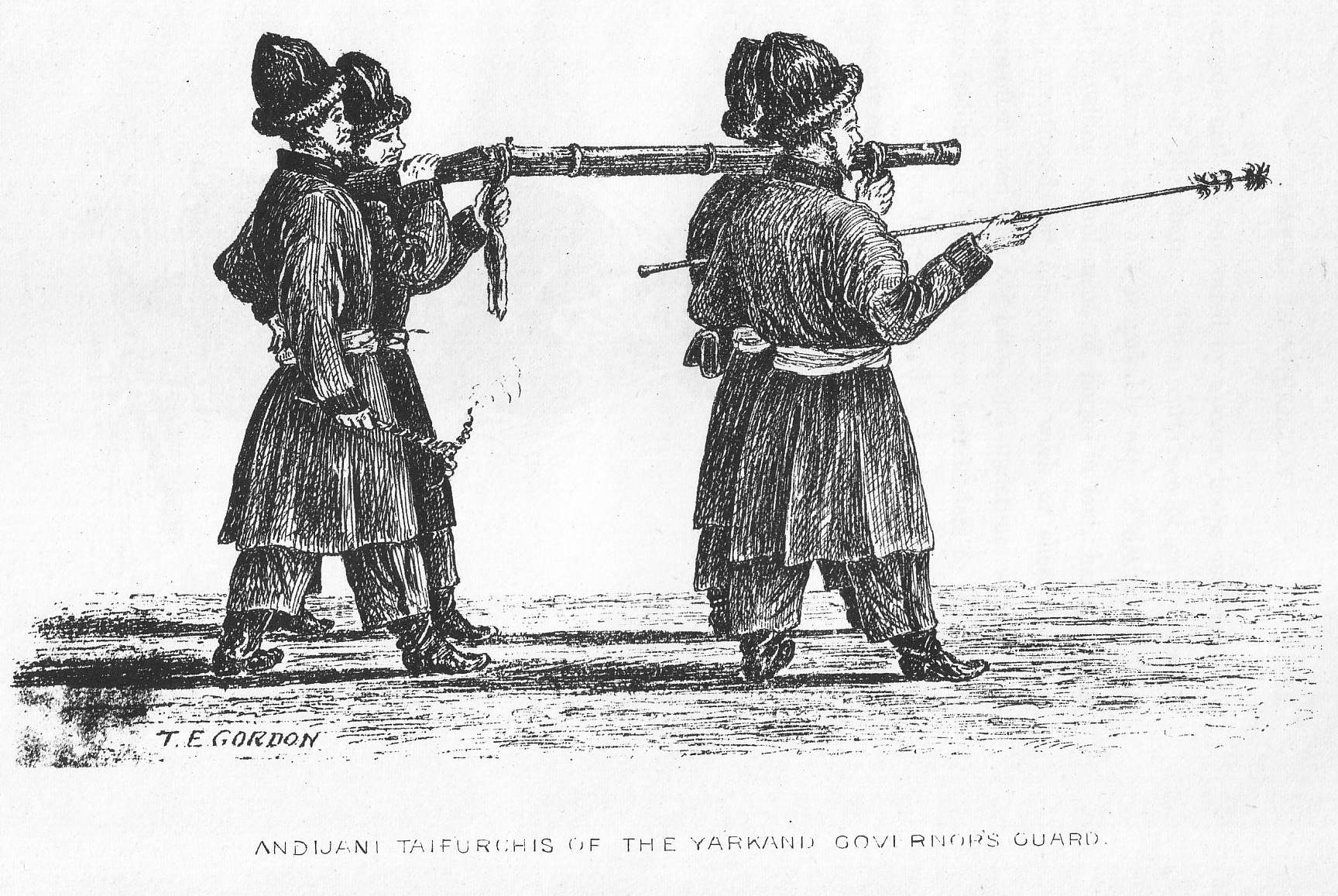
Gunners of the Dungan revolt

The Kangxi Emperor incited anti-Muslim sentiment among the Mongols of Qinghai (Kokonor) in order to gain support against the Dzungar Oirat Mongol leader Galdan. The Kangxi Emperor claimed that Chinese Muslims inside China such as Turkic Muslims in Qinghai (Kokonor) were plotting with Galdan, who he falsely claimed converted to Islam. Kangxi falsely claimed that Galdan had spurned and turned his back on Buddhism and the Dalai Lama and that he was plotting to install a Muslim as ruler of China after invading it in a conspiracy with Chinese Muslims. Kangxi also distrusted Muslims of Turfan and Hami.

The Uyghur Muslim Sayyid and Naqshbandi Sufi rebel of the Afaqi suborder, Jahangir Khoja was sliced to death (Lingchi) in 1828 by the Manchus for leading a rebellion against the Qing.

=== Ming loyalist Muslims ===
When forces of the Qing dynasty entered China proper in 1644, Muslim Ming loyalists in Gansu led by Muslim leaders Milayin and Ding Guodong led a revolt in 1646 against the Qing during the Milayin rebellion in order to drive the Qing out and restore the Ming Prince of Yanchang Zhu Shichuan to the throne as the emperor. The Muslim Ming loyalists were supported by Hami's Sultan Sa'id Baba and his son Prince Turumtay. The Muslim Ming loyalists were joined by Tibetans and Han Chinese in the revolt. After fierce fighting, and negotiations, a peace agreement was agreed on in 1649, and Milayan and Ding nominally pledged allegiance to the Qing and were given ranks as members of the Qing military. When other Ming loyalists in southern China made a resurgence and the Qing were forced to withdraw their forces from Gansu to fight them, Milayan and Ding once again took up arms and rebelled against the Qing. The Muslim Ming loyalists were then crushed by the Qing with 100,000 of them, including Milayin, Ding Guodong, and Turumtay killed in battle.

The Confucian Hui Muslim scholar Ma Zhu (1640–1710) served with the southern Ming loyalists against the Qing.

=== Dungan and Panthay Revolts ===
During the time, the Muslims revolted against the Qing dynasty, most notably in the Dungan revolt (1862–1877) and the Panthay rebellion (1856–1873) in Yunnan. One million people died in the Panthay rebellion, several million people died in the Dungan revolt.

However, Muslims in other parts of China proper like in the east and southern provinces who did not revolt, were not affected at all by the rebellion, and experienced no genocide, nor did they seek to revolt. It was reported that Muslim villages in Henan province, which was next to Shaanxi, were totally unaffected and relations between Han and Hui continued normally.

The Hui Muslim population of Beijing was unaffected by the Muslim rebels during the Dungan revolt.

Elisabeth Allès wrote that the relationship between Hui Muslim and Han peoples continued normally in the Henan area, with no ramifications or consequences from the Muslim rebellions of other areas. Allès wrote, "The major Muslim revolts in the middle of the nineteenth century which involved the Hui in Shaanxi, Gansu and Yunnan, as well as the Uyghurs in Xinjiang, do not seem to have had any direct effect on this region of the central plain."

Many Muslims like Ma Zhan'ao, Ma Anliang, Dong Fuxiang, Ma Qianling, and Ma Julung defected to the Qing dynasty side, and helped the Qing general Zuo Zongtang exterminate the Muslim rebels. These Muslim generals belonged to the Khafiya sect, and they helped Qing massacre Jahariyya rebels. General Zuo moved the Han around Hezhou out of the area and relocated them as a reward for the Muslims there helping Qing kill other Muslim rebels.

In 1895, another Dungan Revolt (1895) broke out, and loyalist Muslims like Dong Fuxiang, Ma Anliang, Ma Guoliang, Ma Fulu, and Ma Fuxiang suppressed and massacred the rebel Muslims led by Ma Dahan, Ma Yonglin, and Ma Wanfu.

A Muslim army called the Gansu Braves led by General Dong Fuxiang fought for the Qing dynasty against the foreigners during the Boxer Rebellion. They included well known Generals like Ma Anliang, Ma Fulu, and Ma Fuxiang.

In Yunnan was noted that the Qing armies only massacred the Muslims who had rebelled, and spared Muslims who took no part in the uprising.

== Islam in China (1912–present) ==
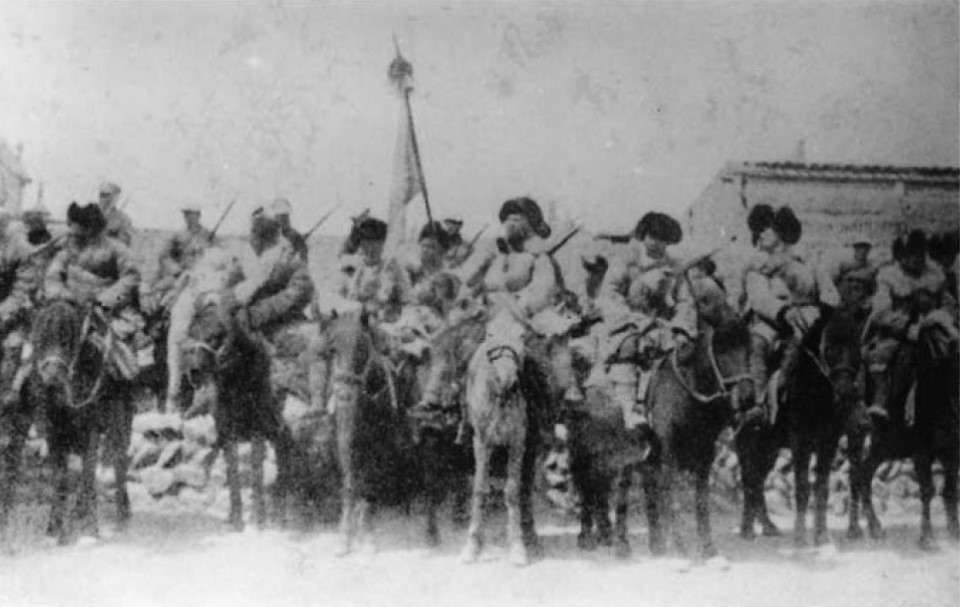
Chinese Muslim guerrilla fighters gather to oppose the Japanese invaders in Northwestern China, c. 1939

The People's Republic of China was founded in 1949, in the aftermath of the Chinese Communist Revolution (1946−1950). Through many of the early years, there were tremendous upheavals which culminated in the Cultural Revolution (1966–1976). During the Cultural Revolution, Islam, along with all other religions in the country, including the traditional Chinese religion, were persecuted by the atheist Red Guards, who had attempted to eradicate them through a series of atheistic and anti-religious campaigns, encouraged by the Chinese Communist Party, to smash the Four Olds. Traditional Chinese, Confucian, and Buddhist temples and monasteries, Christian churches, and Muslim mosques were all attacked.

Sailaifengye, a Chinese Islamic movement related to Salafi Movement, emerged in China in 19th century. Brought by a preacher named Ma Debao (1867–1977), They are known as an apolitical movement focusing on the Wahhabi ideal of scriptural fundamentalism, which became an arguing point as they viewed the Yihewwani were too influenced by Chinese cultural accretions. Their strong apolitical stance cause them to discourage religious extremism or any subversive movement against the government. Akin to the Salafists in Saudi kingdom, the Sailaifengye in their movement rejected the militant oppositions against a state that were raised by Al-Qaeda. The Sailaifengye ate known for their rejection of Taqlid methodology, and their exaltations towards the "three first generations of Islam"(Sahaba, Tabi'un, & Tabi' al-Tabi'in ), which the Sailaifengye named the collectives as "Santay" in their creed. they were persecuted by the pro-Kuomintang Yihewanni warlord Ma Bufang. After the Communists led by Mao Zedong took power, the Sailaifengye community were allowed to worship openly again.

In 1975, in what would be known as the Shadian incident, there was an uprising among Hui in what was the only large scale ethnic rebellion during the Cultural Revolution. In crushing the rebellion, the PLA massacred 1,600 Hui with MIG fighter jets used to fire rockets onto the village. Following the fall of the Gang of Four, apologies and reparations were made.

After the advent of Deng Xiaoping in 1979, Muslims enjoyed a period of liberalisation. New legislation gave all minorities the freedom to use their own spoken and written languages, to develop their own culture and education and to practice their religion. More Chinese Muslims than ever before were allowed to go on the Hajj.

Since the Chinese Communist Revolution (1946–1950) that occurred during the 20th century and throughout the first half of the 21st century, the Chinese Communist government and authorities of the People's Republic of China have reportedly detained more than a million Chinese Muslims in re-education camps. Most of the people who have been targeted and arbitrarily detained in these re-education camps are the Uyghurs, a predominantly Turkic-speaking Chinese-Muslim ethnic group which inhabits primarily the Northwestern region of Xinjiang, alongside Kazakhs, Kyrgyz, and other Turkic Muslim ethnic minorities. Core strategies of the Chinese government's campaign against the Uyghurs and other Turkic Muslim ethnic minorities include identity-based persecution, systematized mass detention and surveillance, forced abortions and sterilizations, forced birth control, forced labor, forced assimilation, torture, brainwashing, and gang rape.

== See also ==
- Islam by country
- Religion in China
- Demographics of China
