= Dungan Revolt (1895–1896) =

Rebellion of Chinese Muslim ethnic groups against the Qing dynasty

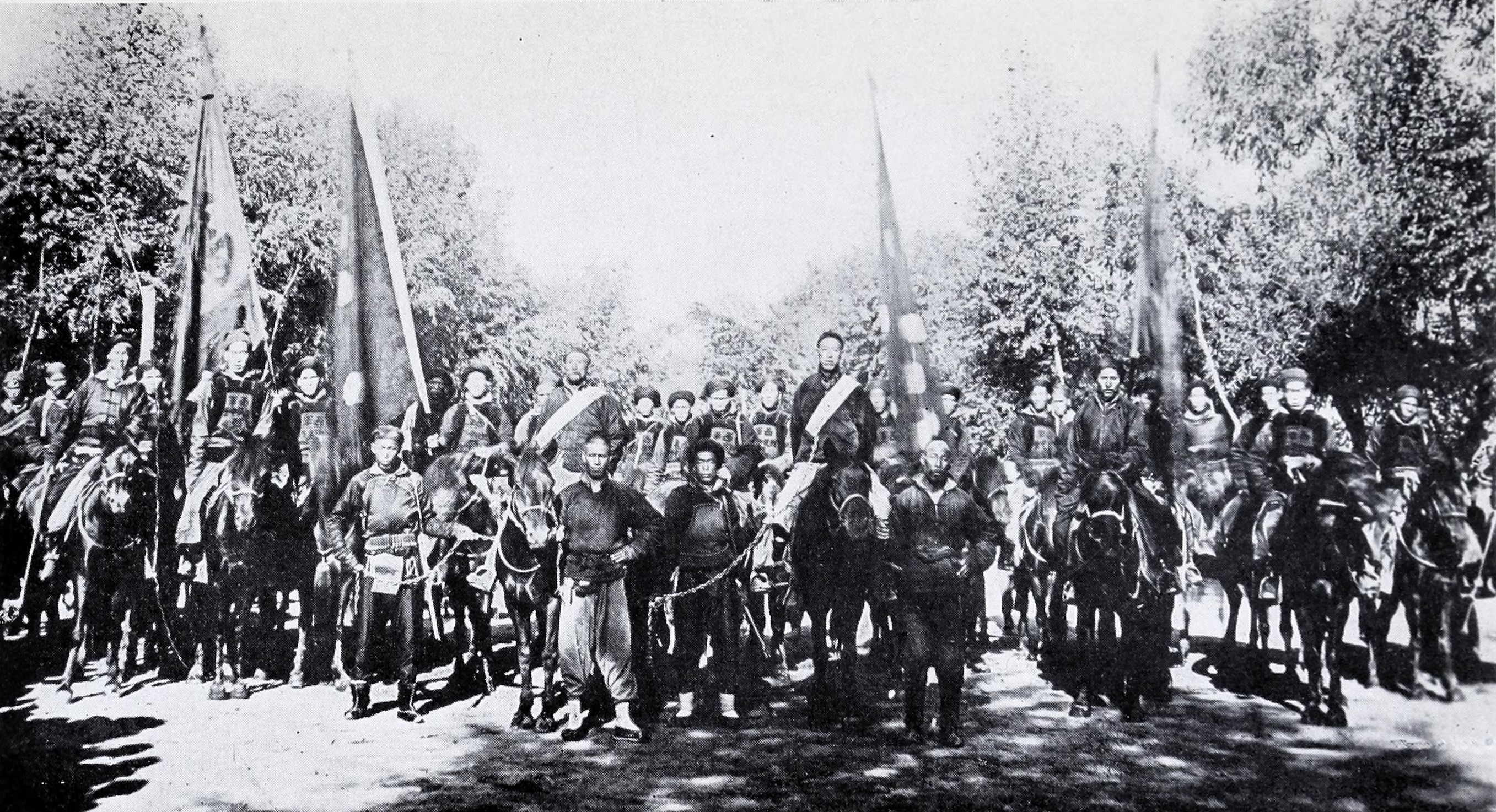
- A column of Gansu Army led by Ma Anliang
Date	1895–1896
Location	Qinghai, Gansu
Result	Qing victory

Belligerents
(Qing dynasty) Qing Empire, loyalist Khafiya Sufis	Muslim rebels, Yihewani and rebel Khafiya Sufis

Commanders and leaders
Yang Changjun; Dong Fuxiang; Tang Yanhe; Yang Zengxin; Ma Anliang; Ma Guoliang; Ma Fulu; Ma Fuxiang; Ma Haiyan; Wei Guangtao	Ma Yonglin †; Ma Dahan †; Ma Wanfu

Strength
Thousands of Loyalist Muslim Hui troops, loyalist Salar, loyalist Dongxiang, loyalist Bonan, Han Chinese, and Tibetans	Thousands of Rebel Muslim Hui, Dongxiang, Salar, and Baoan troops

Casualties and losses
	All rebels killed except Ma Wanfu
- 100,000 deaths

The Dungan Revolt (1895–1896) was a rebellion of various Chinese Muslim ethnic groups in Qinghai and Gansu against the Qing dynasty, that originated because of a violent dispute between two Sufi orders of the same sect. The Wahhabi inspired Yihewani organization then joined in and encouraged the revolt, which was crushed by loyalist Muslims.

== Revolt ==
The Dungan Revolt (1895–1896) broke out in the same place as the Jahriyya revolt of 1781 for the same reasons, sectarian violence between two Naqshbandi Sufi orders. After rival Sufi Naqshbandi spiritual orders had fought and accused each other of various misdeeds, instead of continuing the violence they decided to use the Qing legal system to solve the dispute. They filed opposing lawsuits through the office of the Xining Prefect and the judge in the case decided not to issue a ruling on which group was superior to the other in matters of all Islamic affairs, and urged them to behave. As a result, both groups resorted to violence. A daotai was sent by the Qing to crush the perpetrators of the violence, which ended in several deaths. This led the involved parties in the dispute to rebel against the Qing.

In Xunhua, Qinghai, masses of Hui, Dongxiang, Bao'an, and Salars were incited to revolt against the Qing by the Multicoloured Mosque leader Ma Yonglin. Soldiers were ordered to destroy the rebels by Brigadier General Tang Yanhe. Ma Dahan arranged a deal with the fellow Dongxiang Ma Wanfu when rebelling against the Qing dynasty. In Hezhou, Didao, and Xunhua they directed their adherents to join the rebellion. Tiaoheyan, Sanjiaji, and Guanghe were agreed upon as points in a defensive position and they pledged that they would not capitulate.

Ma Wanfu's Wahhabi inspired Yihewani sect was considered the "new teaching" sect. The Yihewani encouraged the rebellion.

Governor General Yang Changjun sent troops to crush the rebellion.

Dong Fuxiang, the Commander in Chief of Kashgaria (Kashgar), received a telegram ordering that he and General Ma Xinsheng relieve the districts in revolt by conducting forced marches. His loyalist Chinese Muslim troops led by Muslim officers like Ma Anliang, Ma Guoliang, Ma Fuxiang, and Ma Fulu crushed the revolt, reportedly cutting off the heads and ears of rebels. Dong received the rank of generalissimo. Dong Fuxiang's troops from Hezhou were armed with Mausers and Remingtons, which were modern European guns, just brought back from Beijing. Their new weapons severely outclassed the bladed weapons and muzzle loading guns of the Muslim rebels and quashed them in battle.

Ma Anliang's Muslim cavalry defeated Muslim rebels at Oxheart Mountain, and relieved the siege of Hezhou on December 4. He led Hui cavalry troops to slaughter rebel Salar Muslim fighters who had agreed to negotiate unarmed at a banquet by telling them "Disown me as a Muslim if I deceive you.", and received the rank of Xinjiang General, and Hezhou Colonel once the revolt was crushed. The loyalist Muslim Generals led their troops to initiate massive slaughter of the rebel Muslims. They decapitated the rebels and removed their ears. It was said Muslim blood coloured the red cap of Ma Anliang and Muslim heads were used to construct the offices of Ma Fuxiang and Ma Fulu.

In 1895 Ma Anliang lifted the siege of Xining (sining) with four ying (ying is a Chinese unit for battalion).

Ma Wanfu surrendered as the Chinese Muslim loyalist General Ma Anliang and Dong Fuxiang arrived to crush the rebel Muslims, and Ma Dahan was killed while fighting.

Ma Yonglin (Ma Yung-lin), his son, and over a hundred other Muslim rebel leaders were captured and beheaded by Dong Fuxiang.

On August 2, 1896, it was reported that the Qing Generals carried out large scale massacres of the rebels, in one area 8,000 were killed and the females sold into slavery.

Around 400 Muslims in Topa 多巴 did not join the revolt and proclaimed their loyalty to China. An argument between a Han Chinese and his Muslim wife led to these Muslims getting massacred, when she threatened that the Muslims from Topa would attack Tankar and give a signal to their co-religionists to rise up and open the gates by burning the temples atop the hills. The husband reported this to an official and the next day the Muslims were massacred with the exception of a few Muslim girls who were married off to Han Chinese.

Susie Carson Rijnhart recorded that "Among the most interesting of our patients was an old man, Chinese by birth, but possessing the courage and daring of a Tibetan, who had been appointed a leader over fifty of the local troops, and had set out one morning to aid some Chinese in an adjoining village to repulse an attack by rebels. Treacherously one of his men, a carpenter, had stabbed him in the elbow, some said because the former was in the pay of the Mohammedans, who were anxious to be rid of such an able opponent as Cheo Lao-yeh, the old man, was proving himself to be. They remembered his efficient service in the former rebellion, in which, though wounded seven times, he had dealt them many a crushing defeat. The treacherous thrust had made an ugly wound in his arm, but the family being rich, and consequently able to give him every attention, while I spared no pains to aid in his recovery, each day marked improvement. His wife was a Mongol. His only child was an attractive young married woman of twenty wearing the Mongol costume, which was very becoming to her, while her pretty little baby completed the family group and added much gladness to the lonely hours the old man spent on the k'ang. Many were the presents and incalculable kindnesses bestowed upon us by this man, and when later he died while we were away from home, he asked his daughter to give each of us a rosary he had worn, gifts which we prized very much for we knew they were tokens of sincere gratitude and love."

Tibetans helped crush the Muslim rebels in 1896 like they did in the 1781 Jahriyya revolt. The Muslims of Táozhōu also fight against the rebels and rebel leader Ma Yonglin's entire family was executed.

Generals Dong Fuxiang, Ma Anliang and Ma Haiyan were originally called to Beijing during the First Sino-Japanese War in 1894, but the Dungan Revolt (1895) broke out and they were subsequently sent to crush the rebels.

Due to the rebellion the western Inner Mongolian Han Chinese Catholic village Xiaoqiaopan had defensive procedures instituted by the Belgian priests in charge.

The Han Gelaohui had infiltrated the Qing military in Xinjiang during the revolt and allegedly planned to help the Hui rebels before the Hui rebels were crushed.

Around 100,000 died in the revolt.

In 1909 Ma Anliang ordered the arrest and immediate execution by shooting of six leaders of a new Islamic sect after they returned from Mecca, since he was a member of the old sect and wanted to stop another incident of sectarian violence since fighting between different Islamic sects caused the 1895 Muslim rebellion.

Regular administrative units started replacing tusi in the late Qing and in 1895 the Muslim rebel leaders Ma Yonglin and Ma Dahan were defeated by pro-government Muslims serving under Ma Anliang and Dong Fuxiang. Muslim leaders like Ma Yuanzhang and Ma Fuxiang also declared allegiance to the Republic of China even after China spiraled into warlordism after 1916.

== See also ==
- Jahriyya revolt
- Muslim groups in China
- Dungan Revolt
- List of rebellions in China
- Islam in China
- History of Islam in China
- Islam during the Qing dynasty
