= Tang Yanhe =

- Born: Gansu
- Allegiance: Qing dynasty
- Service years: 1895-1896
- Rank: Brigadier General (zongbing simplified Chinese: 总兵; traditional Chinese: 總兵)
- Conflicts: Salar revolt

Tang Yanhe
- Traditional Chinese: 湯彥和
- Simplified Chinese: 汤彦和
Transcriptions
Standard Mandarin
- Hanyu Pinyin: Tāng Yànhé

Tang Yanhe a Han chinese, was born Gansu, China. He commanded an army of Chinese Muslim soldiers along with Dong Fuxiang, and used them to crush the Muslim Rebellion of 1895.

In Xunhua, Qinghai, masses of Hui, Dongxiang, Baoan, and Salars were incited to revolt against the Qing by the Multicoloured Mosque leader Ma Yonglin. Soldiers were ordered to destroy the rebels by Brigadier General Tang Yanhe. Tang was joined by loyalist Muslim troops to fight the rebel Muslims. The Muslim officers Ma Fuxiang, Ma Fulu, Ma Anliang, and Ma Guoliang served under Tang, and fought against the rebels at Jishi pass. When Tang's forces were defeated at Shuangcheng the Ma brothers fled south with him. They then massacred the rebel Muslims at Hezhou.

== See also ==
- Dong Fuxiang
