= Yang Changjun =

Viceroy of Shaanxi and Gansu
- In office 6 April 1888 – 20 November 1895
- In office 11 August 1880 – 28 October 1881

Personal details
- Born: 1825
- Died: 1897 (aged 71–72)

Military service
- Allegiance: Qing dynasty
- Years of service: 1895-1896
- Rank: Governor General
- Battles/wars: Dungan revolt (1895–1896)

Yang Changjun (Chinese: 楊昌濬; 1825 – 1897) was a Governor General in Qing dynasty China. He commanded the armies of the Qing dynasty during the Dungan Revolt (1895). His subordinates included Tang Yanhe, Dong Fuxiang, and various other generals.
