= Ma Wanfu =

Chinese imam

Hajji Ma Wanfu
- 馬萬福 / 马万福
- Title: Hajji Guoyuan (果园哈只)

Personal life
- Born: 1849 Guoyuan village, Hezhou, Gansu, Qing China
- Died: 1934 Xining, Qinghai, Republic of China
- Resting place: Suburbs of Xining, Qinghai, China
- Era: 19th–20th centuries
- Region: Northwest China, particularly Gansu, Qinghai, Ningxia, Shaanxi and Xinjiang
- Main interest(s): Islamic jurisprudence, Quranic studies, Hadith studies, Islamic theology, religious reform and Islamic education
- Notable idea(s): Zunjing gaisu (尊经革俗, "venerate the scriptures and reform customs"), pingjing lijiao (凭经立教, "establish religious practice on the basis of scripture"), opposition to hereditary menhuan authority and religious customs lacking a basis in the Qur'an and Sunnah
- Notable work(s): Buharizade (布哈里咱德), a doctrinal compendium compiled with other Yihewani imams from selections of eight Arabic works
- Known for: Founder of the Yihewani movement in China, advocating scripturalist reform of Chinese Muslim religious practices
- Other names: Nuh (نوح), Nuhai (奴海), Nuha (奴哈), Ma Guoyuan (馬果園 / 马果园), Guoyuan Hajji (果园哈只), Hajji Guoyuan, Xiao'erjing: ﻣَﺎ وًا ﻓُﻮْ
- Occupation: Imam, Islamic scholar, religious reformer and teacher

Religious life
- Religion: Islam
- Denomination: Sunni
- Order: Formerly affiliated with the Beizhuang branch of the Khufiyya, within the Naqshbandi order
- Jurisprudence: Hanafi
- Creed: Maturidi
- Movement: Yihewani (Ikhwan, 伊赫瓦尼)

Muslim leader
- Teacher: Walijia Ahong (瓦里家阿訇), Lao Xiaoting (老消亭), scholars at a religious academy in Mecca
- Post: Founder and leading figure of the Chinese Yihewani movement
- Students: The Ten Ahongs (十大阿訇), early Yihewani imams from Dongxiang and neighboring regions
- Influenced by: Muhammad ibn Abd al-Wahhab (through his writings, including Kashf al-Shubuhat), Wahhabi reformist scholars in Mecca, the Hanafi legal tradition, Maturidi theology and established Chinese Sunni scholarship
- Influenced: The early Yihewani movement, the Ten Ahongs (十大阿訇), Ma Qi (later political patron and promoter of the movement), later Yihewani reformers, including Hu Songshan

Ma Wanfu (Xiao'erjing: ﻣَﺎ وًا ﻓُﻮْ; 1849–1934), also known as Hajji Guoyuan (果园哈只), was a Dongxiang Imam of Guoyuan village (果园村) in Hezhou (present day Dongxiang Autonomous County in Linxia Hui Autonomous Prefecture, Gansu Province). He studied in Mecca and founded the Ikhwan (Yihewani 伊赫瓦尼) movement in 1888, also known as the "New Sect" (Chinese Xinjiao pai, 新教派 or Xinxinjiao, 新新教), spreading in Gansu, Ningxia and Qinghai. He (along with the Yihewani movement) opposed Sufism.

== Life ==
Ma Wanfu supported the Dungan revolt (1895–1896) against the Qing dynasty, along with Ma Dahan and Ma Yonglin, but the rebellion was crushed by Chinese Muslim Hui forces led by Dong Fuxiang, Ma Anliang, Ma Fuxiang, Ma Fulu and Ma Guoliang. Ma Wanfu surrendered, betraying the fellow Dongxiang rebel leader Ma Dahan.

In 1915, Ma Anliang and Yang Zengxin arrested and attempted to execute Ma Wanfu, when Ma Qi rescued him as he was being shipped to execution and brought him to Xining.

== Literature ==
- Hu Fan: Islam in Shaanxi: Past and Present. Diss. Bonn 2008
- Ma Kexun 马克勋: "Zhongguo Yisilanjiao Yihewanyi pai di changdaozhe – Ma Wanfu (Guoyuan)" 中国伊斯兰教伊赫瓦尼派的倡导者——马万福(果园) [The Founder of China's Islamic Ikhwan movement: Ma Wanfu]. In: Yisilanjiao zai Zhongguo [Islam in China], ed. Gansu Provincial Ethnology Department. Yinchuan: Ningxia Renmin chubanshe 1982 (Chinese)
- Ma Zhanbiao: "Yihewani jiaopei yu Ma Wanfu" (Yihewani und Ma Wanfu), In: Xibei Huizu yu Yiselanjiao. Yinchuan: Ningxia Renmin chubanshe 1994
- Mikko Suutarinen: The Dongxiang People of Gansu – Ethnic, Religious and Local Identities (Religious Identity) (PDF format; 320 kB)
- Dillon, Michael (1999). China's Muslim Hui Community: Migration, Settlement and Sects. Psychology Press. ISBN 978-0-7007-1026-3.

== See also ==
- Muhammad ibn Abd al-Wahhab
