= Kansu Braves =

Qing-era Chinese Muslim military unit

Gansu Braves
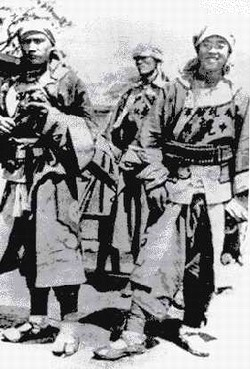
- Three Muslim soldiers from the Gansu Army
- Active: 1895–1901
- Country: Qing Empire
- Allegiance: Emperor of China
- Branch: Wuwei Corps
- Type: Army
- Role: Force protection Land warfare Public security
- Size: Division ~10,000
- Garrison/HQ: Gansu, then Beijing
- Nickname: Kansu Braves
- Equipment: Krupp artillery, Mauser rifles, swords, halberds
- Engagements: Dungan revolt (1895–96); Battle of Langfang; Siege of the International Legations (Boxer Rebellion); Battle of Peking

Commanders
- Notable commanders: Dong Fuxiang (general in chief); Ma Fuxiang, Ma Fulu, Ma Fuxing

Kansu Braves
- Traditional Chinese: 甘軍
- Simplified Chinese: 甘军
- Literal meaning: Gansu Army
Transcriptions
Standard Mandarin
- Hanyu Pinyin: Gān Jūn
- Wade–Giles: Kan¹ Chün¹
Yue: Cantonese
- Yale Romanization: Gām Gwān
- Jyutping: Gam1 Gwan1

The Gansu Braves or Gansu Army was a combined army division of 10,000 Chinese Muslim troops from the northwestern province of Kansu (Gansu) in the last decades of the Qing dynasty (1644–1912). Loyal to the Qing, the Braves were recruited in 1895 to suppress a Muslim revolt in Gansu. Under the command of General Dong Fuxiang (1839–1908), they were transferred to the Beijing metropolitan area in 1898, where they officially became the Rear Division of the Wuwei Corps, a modern army that protected the imperial capital. The Gansu Army included Hui Muslims, Salar Muslims, Dongxiang Muslims, and Bonan Muslims.

The Braves, who wore traditional uniforms but were armed with modern rifles and artillery, played an important role in 1900 during the Boxer Rebellion. After helping to repel the Seymour Expedition, a multinational foreign force sent from Tianjin to relieve the Beijing Legation Quarter in early June, the Muslim troops were the fiercest attackers during the siege of the legations from 20 June to 14 August. They suffered heavy casualties at the Battle of Peking, in which the Eight-Nation Alliance relieved the siege. The Kansu Braves then guarded the Imperial Court on their journey to Xi'an.

== Origins in Gansu ==
Location of Gansu Province within China in 1895

In the spring of 1895, a Muslim revolt erupted in the southern parts of Gansu province. Dong Fuxiang (1839–1908), who had fought under Zuo Zongtang (1812–1885) in the suppression of a larger Muslim rebellion in the 1860s and 1870s, had by 1895 become Imperial Commissioner in Gansu and he now commanded the Muslim militias that Zuo had recruited locally. In early July 1895, Dong commanded these troops in relieving the siege of Didao by Muslims rebels.

When he attended Empress Dowager Cixi's sixtieth birthday celebrations in Beijing in August 1895, he was recommended to Cixi by the powerful Manchu minister Ronglu. The Muslim rebels, who were armed with muzzleloaders and various white arms, were overwhelmed by the firepower of the modern Remington and Mauser rifles that Dong brought back from Beijing. Dong also used his understanding of local politics to convince the rebels to return to their homes. By the spring of 1896, Gansu was again pacified.

Generals Dong Fuxiang, Ma Anliang and Ma Haiyan were originally called to Beijing during the First Sino-Japanese War in 1894, but the Dungan Revolt (1895) broke out and they were subsequently sent to crush the rebels. During the Hundred Days' Reform in 1898 Generals Dong Fuxiang, Ma Anliang, and Ma Haiyan were called to Beijing and helped put an end to the reform movement along with Ma Fulu and Ma Fuxiang.

Late in the afternoon it transpired that the Empress Dowager was not in the Imperial city at all, but out at the Summer Palace on the Wan-shou-shan--the hills of ten thousand ages, as these are poetically called. Tung Fu-hsiang, whose ruffianly Kansu braves were marched out of the Chinese city--that is the outer ring of Peking--two nights before the Legation Guards came in, is also with the Empress, for his cavalry banners, made of black and blue velvet, with blood-red characters splashed splendidly across them, have been seen planted at the foot of the hills. Tung Fu-hsiang is an invincible one, who stamped out the Kansu rebellion a few years ago with such fierceness that his name strikes terror to-day into every Chinese heart.

— Indiscreet Letters from Peking, Bertram Lenox Simpson, p. 12

But it is grave notwithstanding the laughter. Once in 1899, after the Empress Dowager's coup d'etat and the virtual imprisonment of the Emperor, Legation Guards had to be sent for, a few files for each of the Legations that possess squadrons in the Far East, and, what is more, these guards had to stay for a good many months. The guards are now no more, but it is curious that the men they came mainly to protect us against— Tung Fu-hsiang's Mohammedan braves from the savage back province of Kansu who love the reactionary Empress Dowager—are still encamped near the Northern capital.

— Indiscreet Letters from Peking, p. 10.

== Transfer to Beijing ==
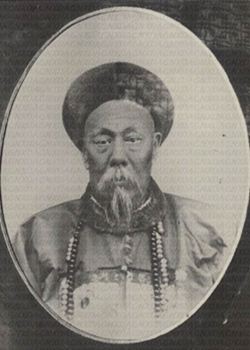
General Dong Fuxiang

Following the killing of two German missionaries in Shandong in November 1897, foreign powers engaged in a "scramble for concessions" that threatened to split China into several spheres of influence. To protect the imperial capital against possible attacks, Cixi had the Gansu Army transferred to Beijing in the summer of 1898. She admired the Gansu Army because Ronglu, who was in her favor, had a close relation with its commander Dong Fuxiang. On their way to Beijing, Dong's troops attacked Christian churches in Baoding. After the failure of the Hundred Days' Reform (11 June – 21 September 1898) sponsored by the Guangxu Emperor, Cixi named Ronglu Minister of War and highest official in the Grand Council, and put him in charge of reforming the metropolitan armies. Ronglu made Dong's militia the "Rear Division" of a new corps called the "Wuwei Corps". Dong Fuxiang was the only commander of the five divisions who did not hide his hostility toward foreigners.

Beijing residents and foreigners alike feared the turbulent Muslim troops. It was said "the troops are to act tomorrow when all foreigners in Peking are to be wiped out and the golden age return for China." during 23 October 1898. Some Westerners described the Gansu Braves as the "10,000 Islamic rabble","a disorderly rabble of about 10,000 men, most of whom were Mohammedans", or Kansu Irregulars, others as "ten thousand Mohammedan cutthroats feared by even the Chinese". In late September and early October 1898, several minor clashes between the Gansu troops and foreigners heightened tensions in the capital. Soldiers from the United States Marine Corps were among the new guards called from Tianjin to protect the Beijing Legation Quarter from possible assaults. By late October, rumors were circulating that the Gansu Army was preparing to kill all foreigners in Beijing. Responding to an ultimatum by the foreign ministers, Cixi had the Gansu troops transferred to the "Southern Park" (Nanyuan 南苑), which was also known as the "Hunting Park" because emperors of the Ming and Qing dynasties had used it for large-scale hunts and military drills. By the 1880s, this large expanse of land south of Beijing – it was several times larger than the walled city – had been partly converted into farmland, but it was conveniently located near the railroad that connected Beijing to Tianjin. The Kansu braves were involved in a scuffle at a theatre. At the section of railroad at Fengtai, two British engineers were almost beaten to death by the Muslim Kansu troops, and foreign ministers asked that they be pulled back since they were threatening the safety of foreigners.

§ 26. At Peking much apprehension was felt from the disturbed political state, but the actual danger came from the turbulent soldiery brought to the capital to guard against the fear of foreign aggression, and of these the most turbulent were the Kansu troops of Tung Fu-siang, stationed in the southern Hunting Park. Men of this force attacked, on September 30th, a party consisting of members of the British and American legations, and the next day the foreign representatives decided to send for a guard of marines from each of their fleets. The viceroy at Tientsin refused to allow them to pass, but, as the envoys [67] Sir C. MacDonald to Lord Salisbury, April 15th, 1898, China, Xo. 1, 1899, p. 102.

— Hosea Ballou Morse, The International Relations of the Chinese Empire, Volume 3, p. 151.

The Chinese government did protest, but without effect. The legation guards were insisted upon, and, as speedily as possible, they were provided from the war-ships of the several powers, and quartered in Peking. Then the Chinese authorities brought troops to the capital, and the sense of danger at the legations grew. On the 25th of October Minister MacDonald cabled to London: "A serious menace to the safety of Europeans is the presence of some 10,000 soldiers, who have come from the Province of Kansu, and are to be quartered in the hunting park, two miles south of Peking. A party of these soldiers made a savage assault on four Europeans (including Mr. C. W. Campbell, of this Legation), who were last Sunday visiting the railway line at Lukou Chiao. The foreign Ministers will meet this morning to protest against these outrages. I shall see the Yamcm to-day, and propose to demand that the force of soldiers shall be removed to another province, and that the offenders shall be rigorously dealt with." On the 29th he telegraphed again: "The Foreign Representatives met yesterday, and drafted a note to the Yamfin demanding that the Kansu troops should be withdrawn at once. The troops in question have not been paid for some months, and are in a semi-mutinous state. They have declared their intention to drive all Europeans out of the north of China, and have cut the telegraph wires and destroyed portions of the railway line between Lukouchiao and Paoting Fu. Some disturbances have been caused by them on the railway to Tien-tsin, but the line has not been touched, and traffic has not been interrupted. In the city here all is quiet. The presence of these troops in the immediate vicinity of Peking undoubtedly constitutes a serious danger to all Europeans. The Yamfin gave me a promise that the force should be removed, but have not yet carried it into effect."

— Alan Campbell Reiley, History for Ready Reference: From the Best Historians, Biographers, and Specialists; Their Own Words in a Complete System of History ..., p. 95.

On the 31st of May, Tung Fuhsiang had an audience of the Throne and upon being questioned stood up and accepted all responsibility in the war of extermination of Foreigners, which he strongly advocated, staking his head on his ability in successfully combating the Foreign Powers. The result was that instead of ordering the suppression of the Boxers, the policy of the Government was suddenly changed, and an Imperial decree was immediately issued appointing Kang Yi and Chao Shu-chiao, Imperial High Commissioners, to organise the Boxers in the vicinity of Peking and bring them under Government control. During this crisis the various Foreign Powers also sent some 400 odd troops into Peking to protect their Legations. By the 4th of June, the Boxer outlaws had begun to tear up and destroy the Railway between Peking and Tientsin, and from that day also began to enter the city walls of Peking, crowding in at the rate of over a thousand a day. Altars (or gathering-places for recruits, etc.) were erected by them all over the city. At this time also these outlaws began the wholesale slaughter of Christians, and burning of churches outside of Peking, until none of the latter have been left standing. As many as could escape, amongst the Christians, then poured into the capital, taking refuge in the Legations situated in the Tung-chiao-ming street (otherwise known as Legation street). This state of affairs, I may say, existed in the capital during the first days of June, from which time I began to jot down the following diary of events as they occurred before my own eyes and were personally experienced by me.

13th June, 1900: 17th day of the 5th moon 26th year of Kuang Hsü:— About dusk, while in the University [of Peking]. I saw four places on fire, whereupon I immediately returned to my house, subsequently learning that all the Churches and mission properties inside the "Eastern City" had been set fire to and entirely destroyed, the conflagration in the Lamplight Market (Night Bazaar) having been especially destructive, lasting far into the next day.

14th June.—I passed the Panshih Residence this morning. The building in the rear of this is now the headquarters of Tung Fu-hsiang and his Kansu troops, who I may state, had already entered the city a few days previously. [The Kansu troops, ever since their arrival from Kansu in the autumn of 1898, had always been kept encamped outside Peking and prohibited from entering the City walls.] At noon, my friend Yang Ch'ao-chió, a Military Chüjén graduate, sent a servant over to my house suggesting that we should join our families together and escape from Peking in company from the dangers threatening all, and fixing to-morrow morning as our time of departure. I, fortunately as it turned out for us all, firmly refused to go with Yang's party, as I had just heard the rumour that steamers had stopped running to Tientsin. I had also heard that the road to T'ungchou was greatly infested by marauding bands of outlaws, that the railway to Tientsin had been destroyed, and the telegraph lines cut. Further, that a relief force of Foreign troops was on its way to Peking from Tientsin, and that that city was in great confusion. With these considerations in my mind, I decided to remain where I was for the present.

— The Japan Daily Mail

Peking, Oct, 30. The Kansu troops encamping to the South of Peking are preparing to retire.

— The Japan Daily Mail

== The Boxer Rebellion ==
=== Rise of the Boxers and return to the walled city ===
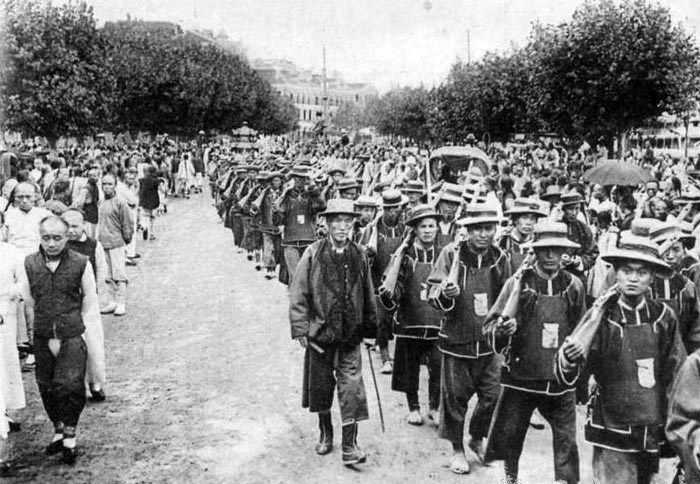
Gansu Army was merged into the Wuwei Corps at the eve of the Boxer Rebellion

"Secondary Devils "—the term used to describe Chinese Christians. Of the family in one of the main rooms, and told them not to get excited or scream. I had scarcely mustered them when nineteen of the Kansu braves came rushing in. Their swords and clothes were still dripping with blood, as if they had come from a shambles. I went forward to meet them, saying politely: 'I know what you have come for: you are looking for secondary devils. However, none of us have "eaten" the foreign religion. You will see that we have an altar to the kitchen god in our back premises. The whole of our family is now here; will you not take a look through the house to see if there are any Christians in hiding?' I meant by this to imply that we should offer no opposition to their looting whatsoever they pleased. I also called a servant to prepare tea. Our guests received these overtures pleasantly enough, and after a few minutes of energetic looting they returned to my guest room, and some of them sat down to take tea. One of them remarked: 'You seem to be thoroughly respectable people: what a pity that you should reside near this nest of foreign converts and spies.' After a brief stay they thanked us politely, apologising for the intrusion, and retired with their booty. It was then about 2 p.m. We lost about $4,000 worth of valuables. Shortly afterwards, flames were bursting from our neighbour's premises, so I made up my mind to remove my family to a friend's house in the north of the city. In spite of these deeds of violence, even intelligent people still believed that the Kansu soldiery were a tower of defence for China, and would be more than able to repel any number of foreign troops. A friend of mine reckoned that 250,000 persons lost their lives in Peking that summer. I used to revile the Boxers in the family circle so much that my own kinsmen, who sympathised with them, would call me an 'Erh Mao Tzu,' and my cousin, fearing that the Boxers would murder me, induced me one day to kotow before one of their altars in the Nai Tzu-fu. To this day I have regretted my weakness in thus bowing the knee."

— Sir Edmund Backhouse & John Otway Percy Bland, Annals & memoirs of the court of Peking: (from the 16th to the 20th century), Act III, Scene I.

It is, therefore, becoming patent to the most blind that this is going to be something startling, something eclipsing any other anti-foreign movement ever heard of, because never before have the users of foreign imports and the mere friends of foreigners been labelled in a class just below that of the foreigners themselves. And then as it became dark today, a fresh wave of excitement broke over the city and produced almost a panic. The main body of Tung Fuhsiang's savage Kansu braves—that is, his whole army-—re-entered the capital and rapidly encamped on the open places in front of the Temples of Heaven and Agriculture in the outer ring of Peking. This settled it, I am glad to say. At last all the Legations shivered, and urgent telegrams were sent to the British admiral for reinforcements to be rushed up at all costs.

— Indiscreet Letters from Peking, Bertram Lenox Simpson, pp. 36-7.

On 5 January 1900, Sir Claude MacDonald, the British Minister in Beijing, wrote to the Foreign Office about a movement called the "Boxers" that had been attacking Christian property and Chinese converts in Shandong and southern Zhili province. In the early months of 1900, this "Boxer movement" took dramatic expansion in northern Zhili – the area surrounding Beijing – and Boxers even started to appear in the capital. In late May, the anti-Christian Boxers took a broader anti-foreign turn, and as they became more organized, they started to attack the Beijing–Baoding railway and to cut telegraph lines between Beijing and Tianjin.

The Qing court hesitated between annihilating, "pacifying", or supporting the Boxers. From 27 to 29 May, Cixi received Dong Fuxiang in audiences at the Summer Palace. Dong assured her that he could get rid of the foreign "barbarians" if necessary, increasing the dowager's confidence in China's ability to drive out foreigners if war became unavoidable. Meanwhile, an increase in the number of the legation guards – they arrived in Beijing on 31 May – further inflamed anti-foreign sentiment in Beijing and its surrounding countryside: for the first time, Boxers started to attack foreigners directly. Several foreign powers sent warships under the Dagu Forts, which protected access to Tianjin and Beijing.

On 9 June, the bulk of the Kansu Braves escorted Empress Dowager Cixi back to the Forbidden City from the Summer Palace; they set camp in the southern part of city, in empty lands in front of the Temple of Heaven and the Temple of Agriculture. Fearing the worst, Sir Claude MacDonald immediately sent a telegram calling for Admiral Seymour to send help from Tianjin. On 10 June, the anti-foreign and pro-Boxer prince Duan replaced the anti-Boxer and more moderate prince Qing as the head of the Zongli Yamen, the bureau through which the Qing government communicated with foreigners. On that same day the telegraph lines were cut off for good.

=== Assassination of Sugiyama Akira ===
On June 11th occurred the murder of the Japanese Chancellor, Sugiyama, by the Boxers, and Tung Fuhsiang's Kansu' troops. The Chancellor attempted to leave Peking by the Yung-ting gate in order to meet Admiral Seymour's relief force, which was on its way to the capital from Tientsin, and which was apparently expected to reach Peking that day. Sugiyama rode in a cart with a broad red band round the body, denoting that the occupant was of, at least, the second rank. When he arrived at the Yung-ting gate he was accosted by a number of Tung Fu-hsiang's men who were guarding it. It seemed that Prince Tuan had that day given secret orders that no foreigner was to be allowed either to leave the city or enter it. He was therefore stopped and asked who he was. Sugiyama told them that he was a member of the Japanese legation. "Are you the Japanese minister?" "No, I am only a chancellor of the legation." "Then what right have you, a petty officer like that, to ride in such a high official's cart?" So they pulled him out of his cart and began to mob the unlucky Chancellor. Sugiyama then demanded to be brought before General Tung Fu-hsiang. "What! You to speak to our Great General! (Ta Shuei.) Why, you are too insignificant to have such an honor!" At last, however, a red-buttoned Kansu officer appeared on the scene, to whom Sugiyama appealed for help. Instead of doing so the ruffian merely ordered the Japanese Chancellor's head to be struck off as a sacrifice to their war banner, and stuck near the gate, "for trying to break out of Peking." Sugiyama was the first foreigner murdered inside Peking. The great mass of the population of Peking were greatly alarmed at these blood-thirsty proceedings, and all were expecting that the Empress Dowager would show some disapproval of the murder of the Japanese Chancellor, belonging to a friendly State, and the member of an Embassy; but the Manchus, one and all, were jubilant when they heard of the murder. Finally the official seal of approval from the highest quarter for this dastardly murder was made by Prince Tuan, who, when he met General Tung Fu-hsiang the next morning, slapped the latter on the back and raising his right thumb called out "Hao" (good!) The raising of the thumb denotes that the person addressed is a "first-class hero."

— China and the Boxers: A short history of the Boxer outbreak, with two chapters on the sufferings of missionaries and a closing one on the outlook, Zephaniah Charles Beals, pp. 73-5.

June 11th.—On this day the general body of General Tung's troops that had remained in the South Park entered the Yungting-men. This is the central gate of the Chinese city on the South. They met a secretary, Sugiyama, of the Japanese Legation who was leaving Peking in order to meet the foreign troops coming to Peking. General Tung's troops asked him who he was. He replied he was an official secretary of the Japanese Legation. The soldiers objected to this, if you are an official secretary why do you use a cart with a red band round it. They seized his ear and made him come off the cart. The secretary knew that it was not a time to reason the matter. He said in a conciliatory tone "Kindly allow me to see your commander, to him I will apologize." The soldiers said, "There is no need." "Then," said he, "I will later on invite your commander to my Legation and my Minister will apologize." The officers with their swords, then killed him by cutting open his abdomen. The Japanese Minister on hearing it asked permission to have the body taken back to the city for burial. After a long time permission was given. Prince Tuan afterwards on seeing General Tung put out his thumb and said, "You are indeed a hero."

— The Boxer Rising: A History of the Boxer Trouble in China, pp. 59-60. The Boxer Rising: A History of the Boxer Trouble in China. Reprinted from the "Shanghai Mercury.", pp. 46-7.

On the morning of 11 June, the British sent a large convoy of carts to greet the Seymour Expedition. The procession safely passed through the areas occupied by the Gansu troops inside the walled city and soon reached the Majiapu (Machiapu) train station south of Beijing, where the relief troops were expected to arrive soon. Except that it they never arrived, and the carts had to head back to the legations. A smaller Italian delegation guarded by a few riflemen narrowly escaped Dong Fuxiang's soldiers, who were lining up to block Beijing's main southern gate the Yongding Gate, but also managed to return safely.

That same afternoon, the Japanese legation sent secretary Sugiyama Akira to the station unguarded to greet the Japanese troops. With his formal western suit and a bowler hat, Sugiyama made a conspicuous target. The Kansu Muslim troops seized him from his cart near the Yongding Gate, hacked him into pieces, decapitated him, and left his mutilated body and severed head and genitals on the street. George Morrison, the Beijing correspondent for the London Times, claimed that they also carved his heart out and sent it to Dong Fuxiang. The Japanese legation lodged a formal protest at the Tsungli Yamen, which expressed its regrets and explained that Sugiyama had been killed by "bandits".

=== Combat ===
Dong was extremely anti-foreign, and gave full support to Cixi and the Boxers. General Dong committed his Muslim troops to join the Boxers to attack foreigners in Beijing. They attacked the legation quarter relentlessly. They were also known for their intolerance towards the Opium trade. A Japanese chancellor, Sugiyama Akira, and several Westerners were killed by the Kansu braves. The Muslim troops were reportedly enthusiastic about going on the offensive and killing foreigners.

The German diplomat in Beijing Clemens von Ketteler killed a Chinese civilian suspecting him of being a Boxer. In response, Boxers and thousands of Chinese Muslim Kansu Braves went on a violent riot against the westerners.

They were made out of 5,000 cavalry with the most modern repeating rifles. Some of them went on horseback.

The Kansu Braves and Boxers combined their forces to attack the foreigners and the legations.

In contrast to other units besieging the legations, like Ronglu's troops who let supplies and letters slip through to the besieged foreigners, the "sullen and suspicious" Kansu braves seriously pressed the siege and refused to let anything through, shooting at foreigners trying to smuggle things through their lines. Sir Claude Macdonald noted the "ferocity" of Dong Fuxiang's Kansu troops compared to the "restraint" of Ronglu's troops.

=== Battle summary ===
Early on Sunday morning, 17th June, a week after we had started, the Taku Forts were taken by U the Allied Forces in order to relieve Tientsin. That city was invested by the Boxers who began to bombard it next day. Of this of course we were quite ignorant. But the Court in Peking must have received instant news of the fact, for on the afternoon of the 18th Captain von Usedom, the German officer in command of the troops left at Langfang, was attacked by the Imperial forces belonging to General Tung-fuh-siang's division. Their numbers were estimated at 7,000 and they were well armed _^ with modern rifles which they used with effect, so that we suffered considerable casualties.

— Charles Clive Bigham Mersey (Viscount), A Year in China, 1899–1900, p. 177.

Messages were then sent back to Lofa and Langfang, recalling trains 2, 3, and 4, the advance by rail being found to be impracticable, and the isolation and separate destruction of the trains a possibility. In the afternoon of June 18, train No. 3 came back from Lofa, and later in the evening Nos. 2 and 4 from Langfang. The latter had been unexpectedly attacked about half past 2 in the afternoon of June 18, by a force estimated at 5,000 men, including cavalry, large numbers of whom were armed with magazine rifles of the latest pattern. Captured banners showed that they belonged to the army of General Tung Fu Hsiang, who commanded the Chinese troops in the hunting park outside Pekin, showing that the Chinese imperial troops were being employed to defeat the expedition. This army was composed of especially picked men, 10,000 strong, commanded from the palace. They were said to be well armed, but indifferently drilled.

— United States. Adjutant-General's Office. Military Information Division, Publication, Issue 33, p. 528.

The Muslim troops led by Dong Fuxiang defeated the hastily assembled Seymour Expedition of the 8 nation alliance at the Battle of Langfang on 18 June. The Chinese won a major victory, and forced Seymour to retreat back to Tianjin with heavy casualties by 26 June. Langfang was the only battle the Muslim troops did outside of Beijing. After Langfang, Dong Fuxiang's troops only participated in battles inside of Beijing.

Summary of battles of General Dong Fuxiang: Ts'ai Ts'un, 24 July; Ho Hsi Wu, 25 July; An P'ing, 26 July; Ma T'ou, 27 July.

6,000 of the Muslim troops under Dong Fuxiang and 20,000 Boxers repulsed a relief column, driving them to Huang Ts'un. The Muslims camped outside the temples of Heaven and Agriculture.

The German Kaiser Wilhelm II was so alarmed by the Chinese Muslim troops that he requested the Caliph Abdul Hamid II of the Ottoman Empire to find a way to stop the Muslim troops from fighting. The Caliph agreed to the Kaiser's request and sent Enver Pasha (not the future Young Turk leader) to China in 1901, but the rebellion was over by that time. Because the Ottomans were not in a position to create a rift with the European nations, and to assist ties with Germany, an order imploring Chinese Muslims to avoid assisting the Boxers was issued by the Ottoman Khalifa and reprinted in Egyptian and Indian Muslim newspapers.

During the Battle of Peking at Zhengyang Gate the Muslim troops engaged in a fierce battle against the Alliance forces. The commanding Muslim general in the Chinese army, General Ma Fulu, and four cousins of his – his paternal cousins Ma Fugui 馬福貴, Ma Fuquan 馬福全, and his paternal nephews Ma Yaotu 馬耀圖, and Ma Zhaotu 馬兆圖— were killed while charging against the Alliance forces while a hundred Hui and Dongxiang Muslim troops from his home village in total died in the fighting at Zhengyang. The Battle at Zhengyang was fought against the British. After the battle was over, the Kansu Muslim troops, including General Ma Fuxiang, were among those guarding the Empress Dowager during her flight. The future Muslim General Ma Biao, who led Muslim cavalry to fight against the Japanese in the Second Sino-Japanese War, fought in the Boxer Rebellion as a private under General Ma Haiyan in the Battle of Peking against the foreigners. General Ma Haiyan died of exhaustion after the Imperial Court reached their destination, and his son Ma Qi took over his posts.

The role the Muslim troops played in the war incurred anger from the westerners towards them.

As the Imperial court evacuated to Xi'an in Shaanxi province after Beijing fell to the Alliance, the court gave signals that it would continue the war with Dong Fuxiang "opposing Count von Waldersee tooth and nail", and the court promoted Dong to Commander-in-chief.

The Muslim troops were described as "picked men, the bravest of the brave, the most fanatical of fanatics: and that is why the defence of the Emperor's city had been entrusted to them."

== Organization and armament ==
They were organized into eight battalions of infantry, two squadrons of cavalry, two brigades of artillery, and one company of engineers. They were armed with modern weaponry such as Mauser repeater rifles and field artillery. They used scarlet and black banners.

== List of people who served in the Kansu Braves ==
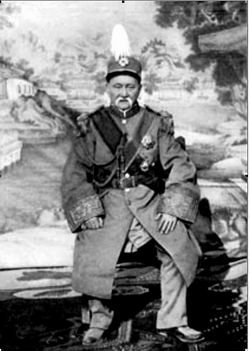
Commander Ma Fuxing

- Dong Fuxiang
- Ma Fuxiang
- Ma Fulu
- Ma Fuxing
- Ma Haiyan
- Ma Biao
- Ma Qi
- Ma Zhankui
- Aema

== See also ==
- Hui people
- Ma clique
