= Ma Dahan =

Ma Dahan (Xiao'erjing: ﻣَﺎ دَا هً) was a Dongxiang Muslim who rebelled against the Qing dynasty in 1895. Ma Dahan arranged a deal with the fellow Dongxiang Ma Wanfu when rebelling against the Qing dynasty. In Hezhou, Didao, and Xunhua they directed their adherents to join the rebellion. Guanghe, Sanjiaji and Tiaoheyan were agreed upon as points in a defensive position, and they pledged that they would not surrender. Ma Wanfu betrayed Ma Dahan since he surrendered as the Chinese Muslim loyalist General Ma Anliang and Dong Fuxiang arrived to crush the rebel Muslims and Ma Dahan was killed while fighting to the death.
