= Wuwei Corps =

Qing dynasty modernized army

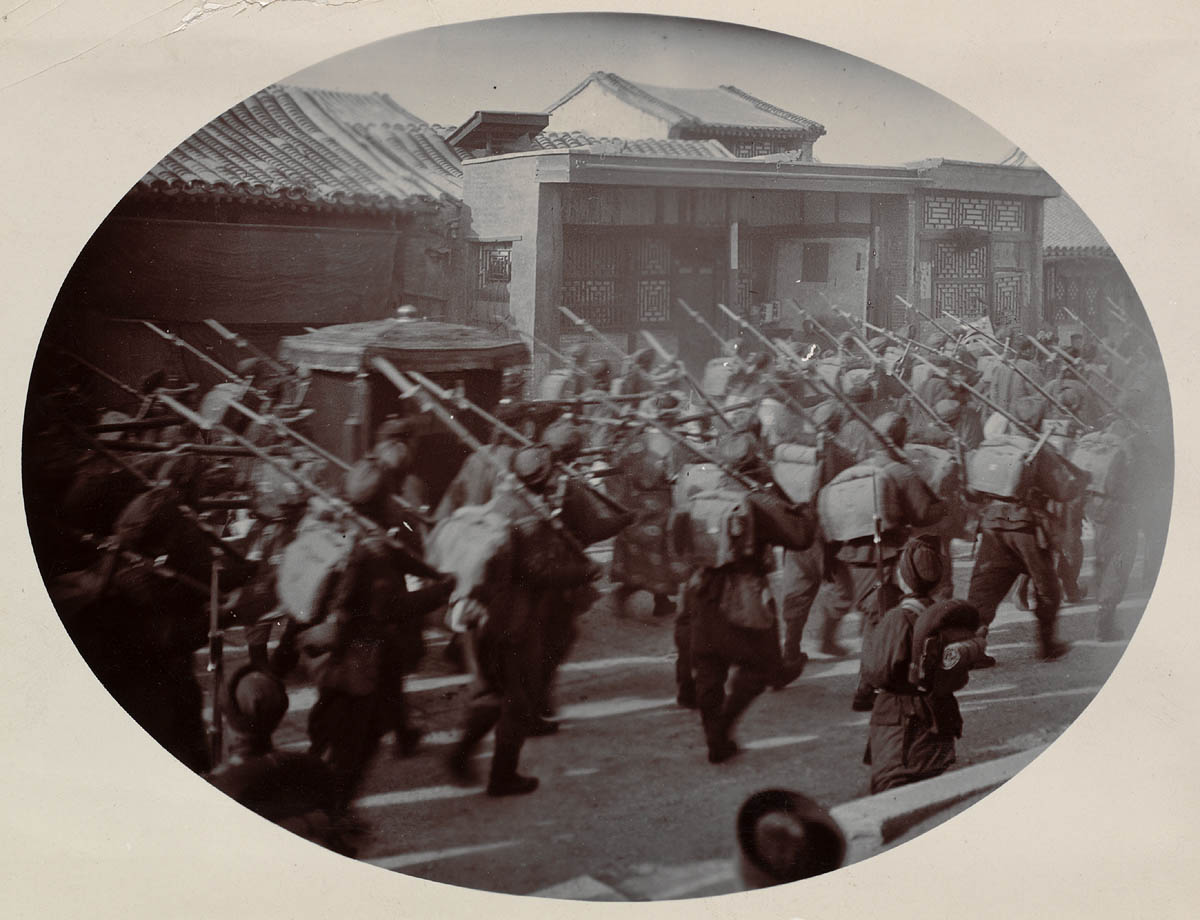
Troops of the Wuwei Corps led by Yuan Shikai escorting Empress Dowager Cixi back to the Forbidden City in 1902

The Wuwei Corps (simplified Chinese: 武卫军; traditional Chinese: 武衛軍; pinyin: Wǔwèijūn; Wade–Giles: Wu-wei chün) or Guards Army was a combined modernised army corps of the Qing dynasty of China. Made up of infantry, cavalry, and artillery, it was formed in December 1898 and trained by western military advisers. The guard took responsibility for the security of Peking (Beijing) and the Forbidden City, with Ronglu as its supreme commander. This move was an attempt by the Qing imperial court to create a western-style army equipped with modern weaponry following the Qing Empire's defeat in the First Sino-Japanese War. Three out of the five divisions of the Wuwei Corps were disbanded after two years due to attrition caused by the Boxer Rebellion.

== Formation ==
Empress Dowager Cixi held supreme power at the Qing imperial court after she placed the Guangxu Emperor under house arrest. Ronglu, who controlled the Grand Council and the Ministry of Defence, subsequently received orders to recruit a 90,000-men army drawn from various units under the control of Nie Shicheng, Song Qing, Dong Fuxiang and Yuan Shikai.

== Five Divisions of the Wuwei ==
The corps consisted of five "divisions" described as "regiments" by some sources: Left, Right, Front, Rear, and Center (Note: Although the Chinese names for these units featured the stem 軍 jun, literally "corps" or "army", recent studies in English appear to coalesce around referring to these units as "divisions" (Purcell 2010, Wang 1995, etc. probably after Powell 1972). The transition from "army" to "divisions" was expressed in one study as follows: "Jung-lu [Ronglu] then proceeded to reorganize the four armies (now divisions)".Purcell 2010, p. 29)

Wuwei Divisions
Division	Commander
Front	Nie Shicheng
Rear	Dong Fuxiang
Left	Song Qing
Right	Yuan Shikai
Centre	Ronglu

Of these, "by far the strongest" was Yuan Shikai's Right Division, which was merely a rebranding of his existing New Army formed in 1895, while Nie Shicheng's Front Division, trained by German military advisers, ranked as second best. These two divisions enjoyed the advantage of a modernised infantry military system and training, while the other three divisions still employed the traditional Manchu Banners Army system. Differences in the prowess of the divisions became apparent during training, even though the entire Guards Army had the same modern weaponry.

Prior to the creation of the Wuwei Corps, Nie Shicheng's Front Division was known as the "Tenacious Army" (武毅軍 Wuyi jun, (Note: 武毅軍; Wǔyì jūn; Wu-i chün)), while Song Qing's troops previously bore the name "Resolute Army" (毅軍 Yi jun). These armies were similarly armed with Mauser rifles and Maxim machine guns.

Dong Fuxiang (Tung Fu-hsiang) led an army of Muslim warriors, dubbed "the 10,000 Islamic rabble" in the West at the time. In China, Dong's troops were familiarly known as the "Gan army" (甘軍 (Note: 甘军; 甘軍; Gān Jūn; Kan Chün)) which used the abbreviated name of Gansu Province where many of these soldiers originated. "Gan army" is a literal translation, but English sources usually use the paraphrased name "Kansu Braves".

By imperial edict, Ronglu received nominal command of the entire Wuwei Corps. His initial task was to incorporate the four pre-existing divisions within the new structure of the Wuwei Corps. Ronglu later added the Centre Division with himself as commander, a unit composed mostly of Manchu bannermen. (Note: During this period, despite his appointment to the Grand Council, Ronglu retained command of the Beiyang Army that defended the capital region.)

== Boxer Uprising ==
During the war against the Eight-Nation Alliance, the Front Division, Rear Division and the Center Division suffered heavy casualties and were disbanded following signature of the Boxer Protocol. The Right Division and the Left Division remained in Shandong Province to suppress a group of Boxers known as the Yihetuan rebels. Both these units remained at full strength as they had not come up against troops of the foreign powers.

From March 1899 onwards at the height of the Boxer conflict, Ma Yukun (馬玉崑) and Jiang Guiti became co-commanders alongside Song Qing at the head of the Left Division.
