= Ma Yonglin =

Chinese Muslim leader

Ma Yonglin (Xiao'erjing: ﻣَﺎ ﻳْﻮ لٍ) was a Chinese Muslim leader of the Multicoloured Mosque who participated in the Dungan revolt and the Muslim revolt of 1895 against the Qing dynasty. He antagonized mobs of Hui, Dongxiang, Baoan, and Salars to overthrow the Qing dynasty in Xunhua, Qinghai. Brigadier General Tang Yanhe sent soldiers to defeat the rebels. He belonged to the Khafiya Sufi sect. Ma Yonglin led assaults on Qing forces. Loyalist Chinese Muslims like Dong Fuxiang, and Ma Anliang defeated Ma Yonglin's rebel Muslim forces. Chinese Muslim officers like Ma Fulu and Ma Fuxiang opposed the rebel Muslims, and defeated them in combat.
