= Ma Haiyan =

Chinese Muslim general

- Born: 1837; Linxia County, Gansu, Qing dynasty
- Died: 1900 (aged 62–63)
- Military career
- Allegiance: Qing dynasty
- Service years: 1877–1900
- Rank: General Officer
- Conflicts: Dungan revolt Dungan Revolt (1895); Boxer Rebellion

Ma Haiyan
- Traditional Chinese: 馬海晏
- Simplified Chinese: 马海晏
Transcriptions
Standard Mandarin
- Hanyu Pinyin: Mǎ Hǎiyàn
other Mandarin
- Xiao'erjing: ﻣَﺎ خَیْ‌یًا

Ma Haiyan (1837–1900) was a Chinese Muslim general of the Qing Dynasty. Originally a rebel, he defected to Qing during the Dungan revolt and helped crush rebel Muslims.

He was the father of Ma Qi and Ma Lin and of Ma Feng.

Dong Fuxiang, Ma Anliang and Ma Haiyan were originally called to Beijing during the First Sino-Japanese War in 1894, but the Dungan Revolt (1895) broke out and they were subsequently sent to crush the rebels.

During the Hundred Days' Reform in 1898 Dong Fuxiang, Ma Anliang, and Ma Haiyan were called to Beijing and helped put an end to the reform movement along with Ma Fulu and Ma Fuxiang.

He fought against the foreign Eight Nation alliance in the Boxer Rebellion with his nephew Ma Biao serving under him, besieged the Catholic Xishiku cathedral and the legations, and defeated the alliance at Battle of Langfang, and died of exhaustion while he and the Kansu Braves were escorting the imperial family to safety. His son Ma Qi took over his posts.

Ma Biao was the eldest son of Ma Haiqing, who was the sixth younger brother of Ma Haiyan, the grandfather of Ma Bufang. Ma Haiyuan was the seventh younger brother of Ma Haiyan, father of Ma Guzhong and Ma Bao, and grandfather of Ma Zhongying.
