= Ma Zhan'ao =

Ma Zhan’ao
- Born: 1830; Linxia County, Gansu
- Died: 1886 (aged 55–56)
- Allegiance: Qing dynasty
- Service years: 1872–1877
- Rank: general
- Conflicts: Dungan revolt
- Awards: 華翎五品頂戴 "feathered cap of the fifth rank"

Ma Zhan’ao (1830–1886) (simplified Chinese: 马占鳌; traditional Chinese: 馬占鰲; pinyin: Mǎ Zhànáo; Wade–Giles: Ma Chan-ao, Xiao'erjing: مَا جًااَوْ) was a Chinese Muslim General who defected to the Qing Dynasty in 1872 during the Dungan revolt along with his General Ma Qianling and General Ma Haiyan who served under him during the revolt. He first sent Ma Chun (Ma Jun) to negotiate a surrender with General Zuo, but Zuo suspected a ruse. Ma then sent his son, Ma Anliang, to negotiate. He then assisted General Zuo Zongtang in crushing the rebel Muslims. In 1877 he and Ma Qianling expelled Muslim rebels who refused to give up from the hills surrounding Hezhou. He had three sons, Ma Anliang, Ma Guoliang, and Ma Suiliang (Ma Sui-liang) 馬遂良. The escape of Han people from Hezhou during the rebellion was assisted by Ma Zhan'ao.
