= Ma Anliang =

Qing dynasty army general (1855–1918)

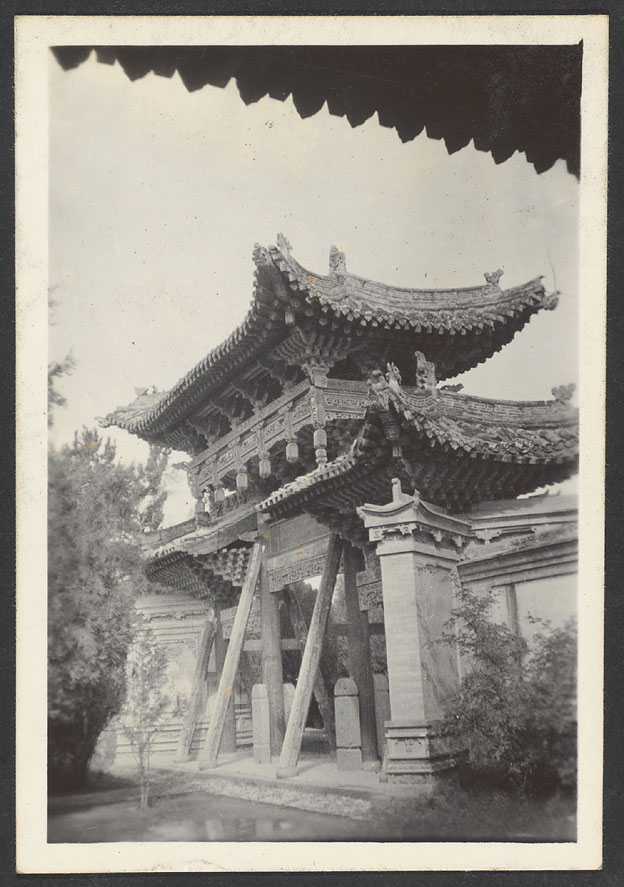
- Pailou arch set up in honor of Ma Anliang
- Born: 1855; Hezhou, Gansu
- Died: November 24, 1918 (aged 62–63); Hezhou, Gansu
- Military career
- Allegiance: Qing dynasty Republic of China
- Service years: 1872–1918
- Rank: General
- Commands: General of Xinjiang, Colonel of Hezhou
- Conflicts: Dungan revolt (1862–77), Dungan revolt (1895–96), Boxer Rebellion, Xinhai Revolution, Bai Lang Rebellion
- Awards: "Second class Wenhu and Chiaho decorations"

Ma Anliang (simplified Chinese: 马安良; traditional Chinese: 馬安良; pinyin: Mǎ Ānliáng; Wade–Giles: Ma An-liang, French romanization: Ma-ngan-leang, Xiao'erjing: مَا اًلِیَانْ; 1855 – November 24, 1918) was a Chinese Muslim military officer. Born in Hezhou, Gansu, China, he became a general in the Qing dynasty army, and of the Republic of China. His father was Ma Zhan'ao, and his younger brothers were Ma Guoliang and Ma Suiliang (Ma Sui-liang) 馬遂良. Ma was educated in Chinese and Islamic education. His Muslim name was Abdul Majid (Chinese: 阿卜都里默直底).

== Military career ==
He defected to Qing in 1872 during the Dungan revolt (1862–77), along with several other Hui Muslims, including his father, Ma Zhan'ao, Ma Haiyan, and Ma Qianling. They belonged to the Huasi menhuan, of the Khafiya Naqshbandi Sufi order. They assisted the Qing Han Chinese general Zuo Zongtang in suppressing the Muslim revolt. In 1877, his father Ma Zhanao defeated a group of Muslim rebels who continued fighting near Hezhou.

General Ma Anliang joined the Qing General Zuo Zongtang, in the campaign against the Turkic Muslim rebels under Yaqub Beg. Ma Anliang led an entire army composed of Chinese Muslim troops against Yaqub Beg's Turkic Muslim forces, and defeated him, reconquering Turkestan for China.

Dong Fuxiang, Ma Anliang and Ma Haiyan were originally called to Beijing during the First Sino-Japanese War in 1894, but the Dungan Revolt (1895) broke out, and they were subsequently sent to crush the rebels.

In 1895, he served with the Han Chinese general Tang Yanhe and the Non-Muslim Gansu native, general Dong Fuxiang, assisting them in crushing another Muslim revolt, the Dungan revolt (1895–96). His Muslim cavalry defeated Muslim rebels at Oxheart Mountain, and relieved the siege of Hezhou on December 4. He led Hui cavalry troops to slaughter rebel Salar Muslim fighters who had agreed to negotiate unarmed at a banquet by telling them "Disown me as a Muslim if I deceive you.", and received the rank of Xinjiang General, and Hezhou Colonel once the revolt was crushed. The revolt was led by Ma Yonglin, Ma Wanfu, and Ma Dahan. Ma Dahan was publicly executed. It was said that Muslim blood stained red cap of Ma Anliang.

During that war, in 1895 Ma lifted the siege of Xining (sining) with four ying (ying is a Chinese unit for battalion). Ma was assigned to "Barkul military command" sometime before 1910.

During the Hundred Days' Reform in 1898 Dong Fuxiang, Ma Anliang, and Ma Haiyan were called to Beijing and helped put an end to the reform movement along with Ma Fulu and Ma Fuxiang.

In 1900, during the Boxer Rebellion, Ma Anliang, as Tongling of Ho-Chou joined Dong Fuxiang in fighting against the foreigners.

In 1905, Ma Anliang, in cooperation with the Han Chinese magistrate Yang Zengxin, attempted to arrest and execute the Yihewani (Ikhwan in Arabic) leader Ma Wanfu. Ma Qi, one of Ma Anliang's subordinates, staged a rescue operation and brought Ma Wanfu to Xining.

Even though he was a Muslim, he and his Muslim troops showed no mercy to Muslims who rebelled against the Qing government, and massacred them.

In 1911, when the Xinhai Revolution erupted, he led over 20 battalions of Hui Muslim troops to defend the Qing dynasty by attacking Shaanxi, which was held by the revolutionaries under Zhang Fenghui. Ma Anliang, Changgeng and Shengyun failed to recapture Shaanxi from the revolutionaries. When the Qing emperor Puyi abdicated, Ma agreed to join the new Republic of China government under the Kuomintang.

Hui General Ma Anliang abandoned the Qing cause upon the Qing abdication in the Xinhai Revolution while the Manchu governor general Shengyun was enraged at the revolution.

Pro-revolution Hui Muslims like Shaanxi Governor Ma Yugui and Beijing Imam Wang Kuan persuaded Qing Hui general Ma Anliang to stop fighting, telling him as Muslims not to kill each other for the sake of the Qing monarchists and side with the republican revolutionaries instead. Ma Anliang then agreed to abandon the Qing under the combination of Yuan Shikai's actions and these messages from other Hui.

In October 1903, in Ili, Ma Anliang served as "Brigade-General". In April 1912 he became "Commander-in-Chief" of Gansu.

== Political and religious orientation ==
Ma Anliang fought against the Bai Lang Rebellion, and attacked the Xidaotang (西道堂) Muslim organization. He was suspicious of the Republicanism of the Xidaotang, since Ma was a conservative and a monarchist and supported Yuan Shikai. Ma arranged for the Xidaotang founder Ma Qixi and his family to be shot dead. Han and Hui soldiers under the Hui generals Ma Anliang and Ma Qi united to fight against Bai Lang's bandit army.

In 1914, Ma Anliang tried to exterminate the "New New-Sect", the Xidaotang and its leader Ma Qixi (his Arabic name was Ersa (Jesus), he was known as "Prophet Jesus" to westerners).

General Ma Anliang was the de facto senior leader of all Muslims in northwestern China from the beginning of the Republican era in 1912 until he died. He was succeeding by General Ma Fuxiang in this position.

Ma Anliang was considered "reactionary", while the learned "scholar" General Ma Fuxiang was considered "progressive".

In 1917, Ma Anliang ordered his younger brother Ma Guoliang to suppress a rebellion of Tibetans in Xunhua who rebelled because of heavy taxes Ma Anliang imposed on them. Ma Anliang did not report it to the central government in Beijing and was reprimanded for it, and Ma Qi was sent by the government to investigate the case and suppress the rebellion.

He died in Hezhou (Hochow) on November 24, 1918. After his death, Ma Anliang was praised by American Vice-Consul at Kalgan, Rodney Gilbert in the Herald for keeping peace in Gansu, which he maintained by his willingness to fight against his fellow Muslims. Ma Anliang was also praised for protecting "his people from sectarian strife and opium".

Ma Fuxiang effectively took Ma Anliang's place as de facto leader of Muslims in northwest China when Ma Anliang died in 1918.

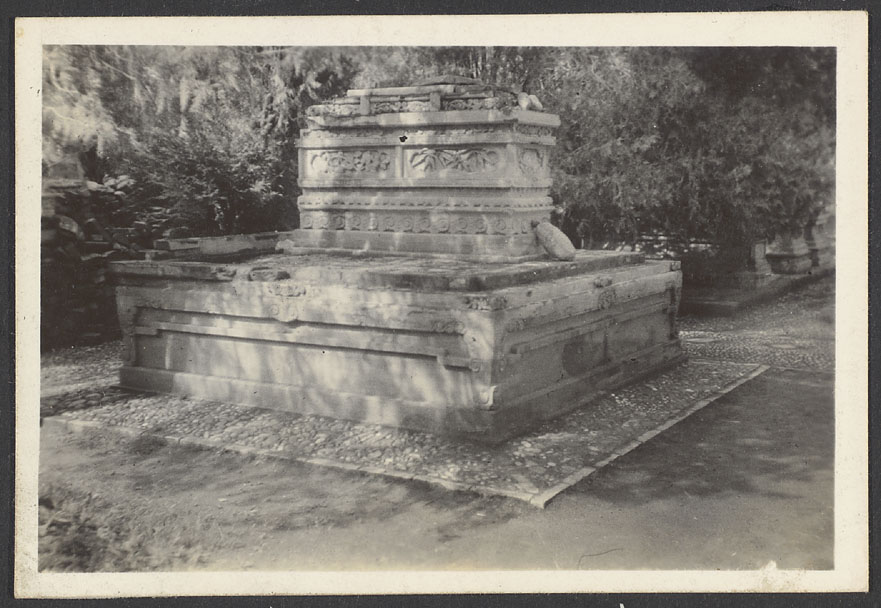
Tomb of Ma Anliang

== Family ==
His father was Ma Zhan'ao and his brother was Ma Guoliang.

He had 5 sons, Ma Tingxiang (Ma T'ing-hsiang) (馬廷勷) (3rd son), Ma Tingxian (Ma T'ing-hsien) (馬廷賢) (4th son), and 3 other unknown children. Ma Tingxian was executed in 1962 by the Peoples' Court. Ma Tingxiang was Ma Anliang's third son. He was executed by Feng Yuxiang after first rebelling against Feng and the Guominjun, defecting to Chiang Kaishek and the Kuomintang after Chiang and Feng went to war against each other, and finally after Chiang dismissed Ma from his posts, attempted to flee and was captured by Feng. Ma Tingxiang and his Muslim army had committed numerous atrocities against Tibetan Buddhists in Chone, Chone Monastery, Taozhou and Labrang Monastery during the rebellion.

== Peerage ==
Yuan Shikai made Ma Anliang a Baron of the First Rank (一等男; Yī děng nán) of the Empire of China (1915–16).

== See also ==
- Ma clique
