= Guanghe County =

Guanghe County 广河县 · ﻗُﻮْا حْ ﺷِﯿًﺎْ
- County
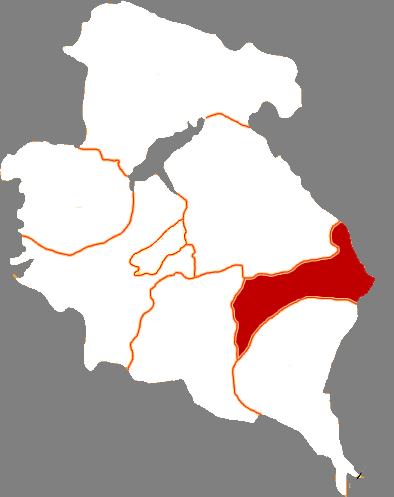
- Guanghe in Linxia

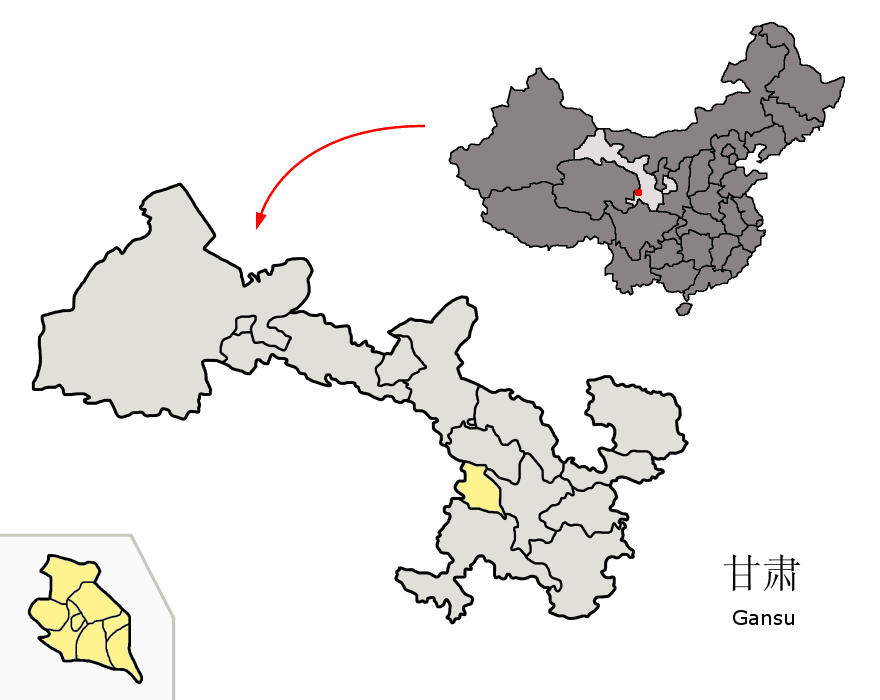
- Linxia in Gansu

- Location in Gansu Location in China
- Coordinates (Guanghe government): 35°29′17″N 103°34′33″E
- Country: China
- Province: Gansu
- Autonomous prefecture: Linxia
- County seat: Chengguan

Area
  - Total: 538 km^{2} (208 sq mi)

Population (2020)
  - Total: 260,596
  - Density: 484/km^{2} (1,250/sq mi)
- Time zone: UTC+8 (China Standard)
- Postal code: 731300
- Website: www.ghx.gov.cn

Guanghe County (simplified Chinese: 广河县; traditional Chinese: 廣河縣; pinyin: Guǎnghé Xiàn; Wade–Giles: Kuang-ho Hsien, Xiao'erjing: ﻗُﻮْا حْ ﺷِﯿًﺎْ) is a county in the Linxia Hui Autonomous Prefecture, located in the province of Gansu of the People's Republic of China. It contains an ethnic minority of the Dongxiang.

== Administrative divisions ==
Guanghe County is divided to 6 towns 2 townships and 1 ethnic township.

Towns

- Chengguan (城关镇)
- Sanjiaji (三甲集镇)
- Qijiaji (祁家集镇)
- Zhuangkeji (庄窠集镇)
- Maijiexiang (买家巷镇)
- Qijia (齐家镇)

Townships

- Shuiquan Township (水泉乡)
- Guanfang Township (官坊乡)

1 Ethnic township

- Alimatu Dongxiang Township (阿力麻土东乡族乡)

== Climate ==
Climate data for Guanghe, elevation 1,953 m (6,407 ft), (1991–2020 normals, extremes 1981–2010)
Month	Jan	Feb	Mar	Apr	May	Jun	Jul	Aug	Sep	Oct	Nov	Dec	Year
Record high °C (°F)	13.6 (56.5)	20.7 (69.3)	26.7 (80.1)	30.3 (86.5)	31.3 (88.3)	31.5 (88.7)	36.2 (97.2)	33.7 (92.7)	31.0 (87.8)	24.6 (76.3)	19.0 (66.2)	11.6 (52.9)	36.2 (97.2)
Mean daily maximum °C (°F)	1.2 (34.2)	5.4 (41.7)	11.3 (52.3)	17.5 (63.5)	21.2 (70.2)	24.2 (75.6)	26.0 (78.8)	24.9 (76.8)	20.0 (68.0)	14.6 (58.3)	8.6 (47.5)	2.6 (36.7)	14.8 (58.6)
Daily mean °C (°F)	−6.7 (19.9)	−2.2 (28.0)	3.8 (38.8)	9.7 (49.5)	13.7 (56.7)	17.0 (62.6)	18.6 (65.5)	17.7 (63.9)	13.2 (55.8)	7.4 (45.3)	0.8 (33.4)	−5.2 (22.6)	7.3 (45.2)
Mean daily minimum °C (°F)	−12.0 (10.4)	−7.5 (18.5)	−1.8 (28.8)	3.2 (37.8)	7.4 (45.3)	10.9 (51.6)	12.7 (54.9)	12.3 (54.1)	8.6 (47.5)	2.6 (36.7)	−4.0 (24.8)	−10.2 (13.6)	1.9 (35.3)
Record low °C (°F)	−24.0 (−11.2)	−21.2 (−6.2)	−16.2 (2.8)	−7.4 (18.7)	−3.7 (25.3)	3.0 (37.4)	4.4 (39.9)	4.7 (40.5)	−0.4 (31.3)	−8.9 (16.0)	−18.2 (−0.8)	−26.7 (−16.1)	−26.7 (−16.1)
Average precipitation mm (inches)	3.9 (0.15)	5.2 (0.20)	12.3 (0.48)	28.6 (1.13)	59.6 (2.35)	59.0 (2.32)	97.1 (3.82)	96.1 (3.78)	66.3 (2.61)	35.4 (1.39)	6.2 (0.24)	1.6 (0.06)	471.3 (18.53)
Average precipitation days (≥ 0.1 mm)	4.4	4.7	6.6	8.1	11.6	12.8	14.0	13.4	13.2	10.1	3.9	2.3	105.1
Average snowy days	6.8	7.4	7.5	2.5	0.3	0	0	0	0	1.6	4.5	4.6	35.2
Average relative humidity (%)	63	61	58	55	61	67	74	77	81	79	72	65	68
Mean monthly sunshine hours	187.9	185.5	211.8	227.4	239.3	233.5	241.2	224.5	167.2	175.6	187.7	195.2	2,476.8
Percentage possible sunshine	60	60	57	58	55	54	55	54	46	51	62	65	56
Source: China Meteorological Administration
