= Ma Guoliang =

- Born: Linxia County, Gansu
- Allegiance: Qing dynasty
- Service years: 1895
- Rank: general
- Conflicts: Salar revolt

Ma Guoliang (simplified Chinese: 马国良; traditional Chinese: 馬國良; pinyin: Mǎ Guóliáng; Wade–Giles: Ma Kuo-liang, Xiao'erjing: مَا قُوَلِیَانْ) was a Chinese Muslim military officer in the Qing dynasty, the son of General Ma Zhanao and younger brother of General Ma Anliang and older brother of Ma Suiliang (Ma Sui-liang) 馬遂良. He helped crush rebel Muslims in the Dungan revolt (1895–1896) along with his brother Ma Anliang, holding them off at Jishi pass. His sons were Ma Tingbin (Ma T'ing-pin) 馬廷斌 aka Ma Quanqin 馬全欽, and Ma Jieqin 馬介欽.

In 1917 Ma Anliang ordered Ma Guoliang to suppress a rebellion of Tibetans in Xunhua who rebelled because of heavy taxes Ma Anliang imposed on them. Ma Anliang did not report it to the central government in Beijing and was reprimanded for it, and Ma Qi was sent by the government to investigate the case and suppress the rebellion.

Ma Guoliang's son Ma Quanqin later defected to the Communists in 1949 and became a member of the Communist party.

== See also ==
- Ma clique
