= Dong Fuxiang =

Chinese general (1839–1908)

- 董福祥
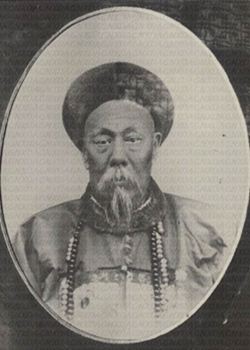
- Born: January 8, 1839; Gansu, Qing Empire
- Died: February 2, 1908 (aged 69)
- Military career
- Allegiance: Qing dynasty
- Service years: 1862–1908
- Rank: General
- Unit: Kansu braves
- Conflicts: Dungan revolt, Dungan Revolt (1895), Boxer Rebellion

Chinese name
- Traditional Chinese: 董福祥
- Simplified Chinese: 董福祥
Transcriptions
Standard Mandarin
- Hanyu Pinyin: Dǒng Fúxiáng
- Wade–Giles: Tung Fu-hsiang

Dong Fuxiang (1839–1908), courtesy name Xingwu (星五), was a Chinese general who lived in the late Qing dynasty. He was born in the Western Chinese province of Gansu. He commanded an army of Hui soldiers, which included the later Ma clique generals Ma Anliang and Ma Fuxiang. According to the Western calendar, his birth date is in 1839.

== Religion ==
Dong Fuxiang was a non-Muslim Han Chinese general who commanded Muslim Hui soldiers. Conflicting accounts were given about his religion and ethnicity. Contemporaneous Western sources claim he was Muslim, which was a mistake, but modern Western sources either say he was not Muslim, or did not mention his religion at all when talking about him, and some mistakenly still say he is Muslim. The only thing that was clear about him was that he was familiar with the Muslim militia of Gansu, and commanded Muslim troops in battle. The British consular officer Erich Teichman traveling in Gansu was repeatedly told that Dong Fuxiang was Han Chinese and not a Muslim, but the consular officer insisted on wrongly believing he was a Muslim. The confusion over his religion was cleared up by Jonathan Neamen Lipman who noted that westerners had made the mistake of assuming that Dong was a Muslim since he commanded Muslim soldiers during the Boxer Rebellion, and the mistake was repeated by later western encyclopedias and works on Islam and on the Boxer Rebellion.

The Chinese Muslim armies of Dong Fuxiang were known as the Kansu Braves and they fought against the German Army and the other eight nation alliance forces, repeatedly at the First intervention, Seymour Expedition, China 1900. It was only on the second attempt in the Gasalee Expedition did the Alliance manage to get through to battle the Chinese Muslim troops at the Battle of Peking. However, Kaiser Wilhelm II was so alarmed by the Chinese Muslim troops that he requested the Caliph Abdul Hamid II of the Ottoman Empire to find a way to stop the Chinese Muslim troops from fighting.

== Military career ==
Dong participated in the Dungan revolt, and defected to the Qing dynasty side, along with Ma Zhanao. He was not a fanatic or even interested in rebellion, he merely had gathered a band of followers during the rebellion and fought, just as many others did. He joined the Qing army of Zuo Zongtang in exchange for being appointed Mandarin. He acquired large estates.

In 1890 Dong Fuxiang was stationed at Aksu, Kashgaria and was a Brigadier.

Dong Fuxiang, Ma Anliang and Ma Haiyan were originally called to Beijing during the First Sino-Japanese War in 1894, but the Dungan Revolt (1895) broke out and they were subsequently sent to crush the rebels.

In 1895–1896, he led his Muslim troops in crushing a Muslim rebellion called the Dungan Revolt in Gansu and Qinghai. Dong Fuxiang was the Commander in Chief of Kashgaria (kashgar), and he received an order by telegram that he and General Ma Pi-sheng rush their army into rebelling districts via forced marching their troops.

Rebel Muslims had revolted, and his loyalist Chinese Muslim troops led by officers like Ma Anliang, Ma Guoliang, Ma Fuxiang, and Ma Fulu crushed the revolt, reportedly cutting off the heads and ears of rebels. He received the rank of Generalissimo.

In 1898, Dong and 10,000 of his Muslim troops were transferred to Beijing in preparation for war against foreigners, and Dong's troop was renamed: Wuwei Rear Division. While they were stationed there, the Wuwei Rear Division troops repeatedly attacked foreigners in their legations, the railways, and in churches. It was reported that the Wuwei Rear Division troops were going to wipe out the foreigners to return a golden age for China. A Japanese chancellor, Sugiyama Akira, was hacked to death on 11 July by the Kansu soldiers. At the section of railroad at Fengtai, two British engineers were almost beaten to death by the Muslim Kansu troops, and foreign ministers asked that they be pulled back since they were threatening the safety of foreigners. Other Europeans and Westerners were killed as well. Ma Anliang, Tongling of Ho-Chou joined him in fighting the foreigners. Rumors were flying around that Dong Fuxiang was allegedly going to massacre the foreigners in Beijing. In a letter sent on 14 May 1899, Robert Hart wrote about the rumors of an alleged impending massacre at the hands of Dong Fuxiang's troops in June. In a letter on 4 June 1899, Robert Hart wrote of the influence Dong Fuxiang was exerting over the Empress Dowager Cixi's policy towards foreigners.

Dong attended multiple audiences with the Empress Dowager Cixi from 27 to 29 May 1900 to affirm in her his belief that he could defeat and expel the foreigners from China. He was so anti-foreign that he used an old Chinese instrument, Sheng Jia, instead of modern brass bands, and had his troops wear traditional Chinese uniforms instead of western military uniforms.

The Boxer Rebellion broke out in 1900, and Dong and his Wuwei troops joined the Boxers in declaring war on the Eight-Nation Alliance. They formed the rear division, and the westerners called them the "10,000 Islamic rabble". They were the most effective soldiers against the foreign armies.

Dong was a sworn brother to Li Lai chung, another Boxer supporter and anti foreigner.

The Wuwei Rear Division troops were organized into eight battalions of infantry, two squadrons of cavalry, two brigades of artillery, and one company of engineers. The Wuwei Rear Division troops reportedly intimidated the Western forces. The Wuwei Rear Division Troops were reportedly eager to join the Boxers and attack the foreigners. They killed a foreigner outside Yungting gate. At Zhengyang Gate, Wuwei Rear Division troops engaged in skirmishes against the forces of the Eight-Nation Alliance.

On 18 June, Wuwei Rear Division troops stationed at Hunting park in southern Beijing, attacked at the Battle of Langfang. The troops were cavalry – about 5,000 men – armed with new, modern magazine rifles. Russian marines in the legations were subjected to a massive attack on 23 June by Dong and his Kansu Muslim troops, who had merged with the Boxers. A German marine was killed and the next day on 24 June an American marine was also killed.

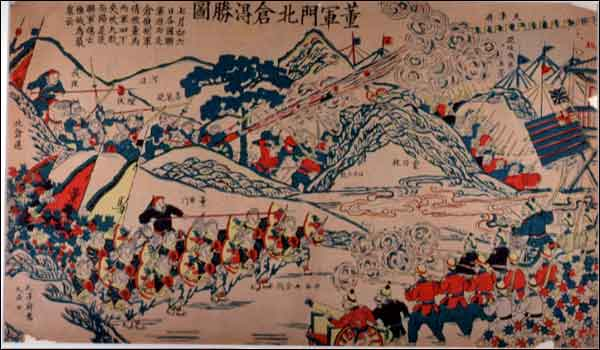
Battle of Beicang, on the outskirts of Tianjin.

Summary of battles of General Dong Fuxiang: Ts'ai Ts'un, 24 July; Ho Hsi Wu, 25 July; An P'ing, 26 July; Ma T'ou, 27 July. He defeated the Westerners during the Battle of Langfang.

The French Catholic vicar apostolic, Msgr. Alfons Bermyn, wanted foreign troops garrisoned in inner Mongolia, but the Governor refused. Bermyn resorted to lies, and falsely petitioned the Manchu Enming to send troops to Hetao where Prince Duan's Mongol troops and General Dong Fuxiang's Muslim troops allegedly threatened Catholics. It turned out that Bermyn had created the incident as a hoax.

When the Qing court decided to run away, the Wuwei Rear Division escorted Empress Dowager Cixi and the Guangxu Emperor to safety in Xi'an. After Dong lost all of his official positions, he still was permitted to command his personal army of 5,000 men in Gansu.

Tsai-I Prince Tuan and Tsai Lan Duke Fu-kuo were sentenced to be brought before the autumnal court of assize for execution, and it was agreed that if the Emperor saw fit to grant them their lives, they should be exiled to Turkestan and there imprisoned for life, without the possibility of commutation of these punishments.1

1 Prince Tuan went no farther than Manchuria for exile, and was heard of there in 1908. Tung Fu-hsiang's sentence was made banishment (to Turkestan, presumably), but he came back to Kansu province in 1906, and lived there in harmless old age.

— The Boxer Rebellion: A Political and Diplomatic Review, Paul Henry Clements, p. 201.

During his exile in Gansu, he held a great deal of local political power while protected by his bodyguards, local decisions had to be made with his consent. Two fortresses and many estates were at his disposal. Upon his death in 1908, all the ranks and honors which were stripped from him due to the foreign demands were restored and he was given a full military burial.

Dong Fuxiang's family, his wife Tung Chao-shih (Dong Zhaoshi), nephew Tung Wen (Dong Wen), and grandson Tung Kung (Dong Gong) fought for the Qing dynasty during the Xinhai Revolution in 1911 in Gansu.

== See also ==
- Abdul Hamid II
- Imperial Decree on events leading to the signing of Boxer Protocol
- Ma Fuxiang
