= Ma Fulu =

Chinese Muslim General

- Born: 馬福祿 1854; Linxia County, Gansu, Qing dynasty
- Died: 1900 (aged 45–46); Beijing, Qing dynasty
- Military career
- Allegiance: Qing dynasty
- Service years: 1889–1900
- Unit: Kansu braves
- Conflicts: Dungan revolt (1895–1896) Boxer Rebellion: Battle of Peking †

Ma Fulu
- Traditional Chinese: 馬福祿
- Simplified Chinese: 马福禄
Transcriptions
Standard Mandarin
- Hanyu Pinyin: Mǎ Fúlù
other Mandarin
- Xiao'erjing: ﻣَﺎ فُ‌لُ

Ma Fulu (Chinese: 马福禄; pinyin: Mǎ Fúlù, Xiao'erjing: ﻣَﺎ فُ‌لُ; 1854 – 1900) was a Chinese Muslim general who served under the Qing dynasty. The son of General Ma Qianling and the brother of Ma Fucai, Ma Fushou and Ma Fuxiang, he was born in Linxia County, Gansu. Ma Fulu rose to prominence for his role in suppressing the Dungan revolt (1895–1896) as part of loyalist Qing Muslim forces under General Dong Fuxiang. During the Boxer Rebellion, he commanded Hui cavalry units in the "Kansu Braves" and fought in key battles against the Eight Nation Alliance, including the Battle of Langfang and the Battle of Peking (1900), where he was killed in action. His military legacy was carried on by his brother Ma Fuxiang and his son Ma Hongbin.

== Early life and education ==
He was a middle born son. In 1880, Ma Fulu went to Beijing to take advanced military exams when he had an audience before the Emperor. He accidentally committed a faux pas since he did not know proper palace etiquette and subsequently served as a guard for the Emperor to make up for this incident.

He studied at a martial arts hall and military school.

== Military career ==
In 1895, he served under general Dong Fuxiang, leading loyalist Chinese Muslims to crush a revolt by rebel Muslims in the Dungan revolt (1895–1896). His loyalist Muslim troops slaughtered and beheaded the rebel Muslims and his commanding officers received the heads of the rebels from Ma. In 1897, a military Jinshi degree was awarded to Ma Fulu.

Ma was transferred along with his brother Ma Fuxiang and several cousins to serve as officers under General Dong Fuxiang to Beijing in 1898. During the Hundred Days' Reform in 1898, Dong Fuxiang, Ma Anliang and Ma Haiyan were called to Beijing and helped put an end to the reform movement along with Ma Fulu and Ma Fuxiang.

During the Boxer Rebellion, the Muslim troops came to be known as the "Kansu Braves" and fought against the Eight Nation Alliance. Ma Fulu and Ma Fuxiang both participated in ambushing and driving back the Alliance forces at the Battle of Langfang during the Seymour Expedition, leading a force of Hui, Dongxiang, and Baoan Muslims to drive the Alliance back to Tianjin and personally leading a cavalry charge, cutting down enemy troops with his sword.

== Death and legacy ==
Ma Fulu and four cousins of his were killed in action during the battle against the foreigners in Beijing, in 1900 during the Battle of Peking (1900) during a bloody battle at Zhengyang Gate. His paternal cousins Ma Fugui 馬福貴, Ma Fuquan 馬福全 and his paternal nephews Ma Yaotu 馬耀圖 and Ma Zhaotu 馬兆圖 died in the battle. 100 of his fellow Hui and Dongxiang soldiers from his home village were killed in action at the Zhengyang Gate in the Siege of Peking. He had commanded a brigade, his brother Ma Fuxiang took over his position after his death. Ma Fuxiang inherited Ma Fulu's army.

He had a son, Ma Hongbin, who later became a General in charge of the 84th Army Corps.

Ma Fuxing, a Hui who played an important part in the history of Xinjiang, served under Ma Fulu during the Boxer Rebellion.

In the Second Sino-Japanese War, when the Japanese asked the Muslim General Ma Hongkui to defect and become head of a Muslim puppet state under the Japanese, Ma responded through Zhou Baihuang, the Ningxia Secretary of the Nationalist Party to remind the Japanese military chief of staff Itagaki Seishiro that many of his relatives fought and died in battle against Eight Nation Alliance forces during the Battle of Peking, including his uncle Ma Fulu, and that Japanese troops made up the majority of the Alliance forces so there would be no cooperation with the Japanese.

Originally buried at a Hui cemetery in Beijing, in 1995 Ma Fulu's remains were moved by his descendants to Yangzhushan in Linxia County.
