= Battle of Ürümqi =

There were multiple battles of Ürümqi; several took place in the 1870s during the Dungan Revolt. During the Kumul Rebellion, the first one was fought in the spring of 1933, and the second one fought from December 1933 to January 1934. They were fought at the capital of Xinjiang, the city of Ürümqi.

- Battle of Ürümqi (1870) – 1870
- Battle of Ürümqi (1933) – Spring of 1933
- Battle of Ürümqi (1933–34) – December and January 1934
