= Liu Jintang =

Chinese painter and art educator

Liu Jintang (March 8, 1894 – March 15, 1937), also known as Wang Yuezhi and originally styled Yuezhi, was a native of Taichung, Taiwan. He was a watercolorist, oil painter, and Teacher, and is regarded as one of the pioneers of Chinese art in early modern China.

== History ==
Liu Jintang was born in Dingqiaozitou, Taichung County, Qing Taiwan (now Dingnan Village, South District, Taichung City), as the third of four brothers. His family originally ran a rice business, but due to the upheavals of war, their fortunes declined, and they moved to the countryside to take up farming. After graduating from the branch campus of Taichung Public School (now Taichung Heping Elementary School in the South District), Liu was admitted to the Normal Department of the Governor-General’s National Language School(present-day University of Taipei). In 1914, he graduated as an outstanding student in the field of art and was awarded a government scholarship to study in mainland Japan. Upon passing the scholarship examination, he first enrolled at the Kawabata Painting School to study drawing. He later passed the entrance exam to the Western Painting Division of the Tokyo Fine Arts School (now Tokyo University of the Arts), where he studied under renowned masters such as Fujishima Takeji.

In 1919, following the outbreak of the May Fourth Movement, Liu Jintang was deeply influenced by the wave of national awakening and resolutely suspended his studies. The following year, he boarded a ship to Shanghai, hoping to meet Sun Yat-sen and participate in the Nationalist Revolution. Upon learning of Liu’s request for an audience, Sun Yat-sen entrusted Wang Faqin, a senior member of the Kuomintang Central Committee, to receive him. Wang later proposed to adopt Liu as his godson, and Liu subsequently changed his name to Wang Yuezhi. Encouraged by Wang Faqin to complete his education in Japan—with the promise of future support for his artistic career—Liu returned to the Tokyo Fine Arts School and completed his studies.

In 1921, after graduating from the Tokyo Fine Arts School, Liu Jintang furthered his studies by enrolling in the Department of Chinese Literature at Peking University, where he delved into Chinese literary studies. During this period, he met and married Guo Shumin, a woman from Hebei Province. While in Beijing, he actively participated in enlightenment movements such as the Taiwan Cultural Association and the Petition Movement for the Establishment of a Taiwanese Parliament. During his time in Beijing, Liu resided at the Wang Residence in Xishuanmazhuang, owned by his adoptive father Wang Faqin, until January 1923, when he moved out after his marriage and rented a house in Gaochalahutong. During this time, he became acquainted with influential figures of the New Culture Movement such as Li Dazhao, Liu Bannong, and Zhang Shizhao. Together with fellow professors from his university, including Li Yishi and Wu Fading, he co-founded the "Apollo Society," a Western painting research group dedicated to promoting art education and the creation of oil and watercolor paintings. He also established the "Apollo Art Research Institute," where he taught Western painting techniques and knowledge during summer sessions. In 1925, due to personnel changes, both the Apollo Society and the Art Research Institute were dissolved. Subsequently, Liu collaborated with painter He Tianjian and others to raise funds for the establishment of the private Beiping Academy of Fine Arts. He relocated to a three-story building in the Ping'anli area of today Beijing's Xicheng District, which served as the school’s premises and student dormitory. At the same time, he was commissioned by the Ministry of Education of the Beijing government to travel to Japan as an education inspector to study art education, and he took the opportunity to visit Taiwan for further research. Later, Liu served as an advisor to the Overseas Chinese Affairs Bureau in Beijing and co-founded the "Taiwan Research Association" with several Taiwanese compatriots, serving as its president.

In 1928, Liu Jintang was invited by Lin Fengmian to teach at the National Academy of Art, where he also served as a preparatory and review committee member for the First National Art Exhibition. During this period, he created a watercolor series titled West Lake Landscapes. Subsequently, he returned to Beijing and, at the request of his friend Chu Xiaoshi, assumed the position of president of the Jinghua Academy of Fine Arts, while also serving as a professor at the National Beiping Academy of Fine Arts. However, in 1931, following the outbreak of the Mukden Incident (September 18 Incident), his adoptive father Wang Faqin became a wanted figure due to involvement in political struggles, and Liu Jintang was also implicated. During this turbulent time, he produced several works reflecting the social reality, including Portrait of the Abandoned, Taiwanese Survivors, and Diary of an Exile.

In 1932, Liu Jintang reestablished the Private Beiping Academy of Fine Arts in today Xicheng District, which was later renamed the Beiping Academy of Fine Arts. In 1934, the institution received official recognition from the Ministry of Education and was reorganized as the Private Beijing Vocational School of Arts.

In 1937, Liu Jintang died in Beijing at the age of 44 due to peritonitis caused by a worsening case of appendicitis.After his death, his wife Guo Shumin took over the management of the school. However, following the fall of Beijing, the school was eventually forced to close.

== Legacy ==
According to the testimony of Liu Yì, the third son of Liu Jintang, his mother preserved Liu Jintang's artworks throughout World War II and the postwar period. Beginning in 1978, Liu Yì started organizing his father's works and related materials. He also wrote a piece of literary reportage titled Portrait of the Abandoned, which was published in the 7th issue of Beijing Literature and Art in 1979, drawing public attention. This provided an opportunity for him to establish connections with the art community in Taiwan.

In 1982, the 12th issue of Fine Arts magazine published an article and related records commemorating the 45th anniversary of Liu Jintang’s death. In the same year, Liu Jintang’s family donated more than 40 of his preserved works to the National Art Museum of China. In 1994, to mark the centennial of Liu Jintang’s birth, the Taipei Fine Arts Museum held a memorial exhibition titled The Centennial Retrospective of Liu Jintang.

== Style ==
Liu Jintang’s artistic career can be divided into three major periods, as follows:

The First Creative Period (1921–1923) was marked by the influence of Impressionism, characterized by the use of soft colors and the depiction of light and shadow. However, during this phase, Liu had already begun experimenting with outlining human figures using black oil paint—an early sign of his stylistic individuality.

The Second Creative Period (1928–1929) is regarded as a pivotal stage in Liu’s artistic development. Representative works from this period include Swallows in Flight, Double Seventh Festival, and Watering the Seedlings of Love. He also produced a substantial number of landscape paintings centered on West Lake. His format shifted from traditional horizontal oil paintings to vertically oriented compositions resembling Chinese hanging scrolls. During this time, he employed black oil lines for outlining and adopted Chinese mounting techniques for presentation, reflecting a synthesis of Eastern and Western aesthetics.

The Third Creative Period (1929–1934) marked the peak of Liu’s artistic output. His works increasingly engaged with contemporary social issues, focusing on the human condition and the struggle of individuals against fate. The style of this period became more personalized, and his techniques matured significantly. Notable works include Portrait of the Abandoned, Taiwanese Survivors, Diary of an Exile, A Corner of Beihai Park, Fragrant Hills, Jade Spring Mountain, and Science and Oviparity.
