= Battle of Ürümqi (1870) =

1870 conflict

- Part of the Dungan Revolt (1862–77)
Date	1870
Location	Ürümqi, Xinjiang
Result	Kashgaria victory

Belligerents
Yettishar (Turki Muslim rebels)	Chinese muslim rebels (Tungans)

Commanders and leaders
Yaqub Beg; Xu Xuegong	Tuo Ming (Daud Khalifa)

Strength
Thousands of Turkic Andijani Uzbek muslim troops 1,500 Han Chinese militia	Thousands of Chinese Muslim troops

The Battle of Ürümqi (Chinese: 迪化之戰) was a battle waged by Yaqub Beg's Turkic kingdom of Yettishar against Chinese Muslim rebels in Ürümqi in a bid to conquer all of Xinjiang and subjugate Chinese Muslims under his control.

== Battle ==
Yaqub Beg's Turkic Andijani Uzbek Muslim forces declared a Jihad against Chinese Muslims (Dungans) under T'o Ming (Tuo Ming a.k.a. Daud Khalifa) during the Dungan Revolt. Yaqub Beg enlisted non Muslim Han Chinese militia under Xu Xuegong (Hsu Hsuehkung) in order to fight against the Chinese Muslims. Yaqub Beg had 1,500 Han Chinese militia with his Turkic forces attacking Dungans in Urumchi. The following year, in 1871, the Han Chinese militia switched sides and then joined the Dungans in a revolt against the Turkic forces. T'o Ming's forces were defeated by Yaqub, who planned to conquer Dzungharia. Yaqub intended to seize all Dungan territory.
