= History of Yunnan =

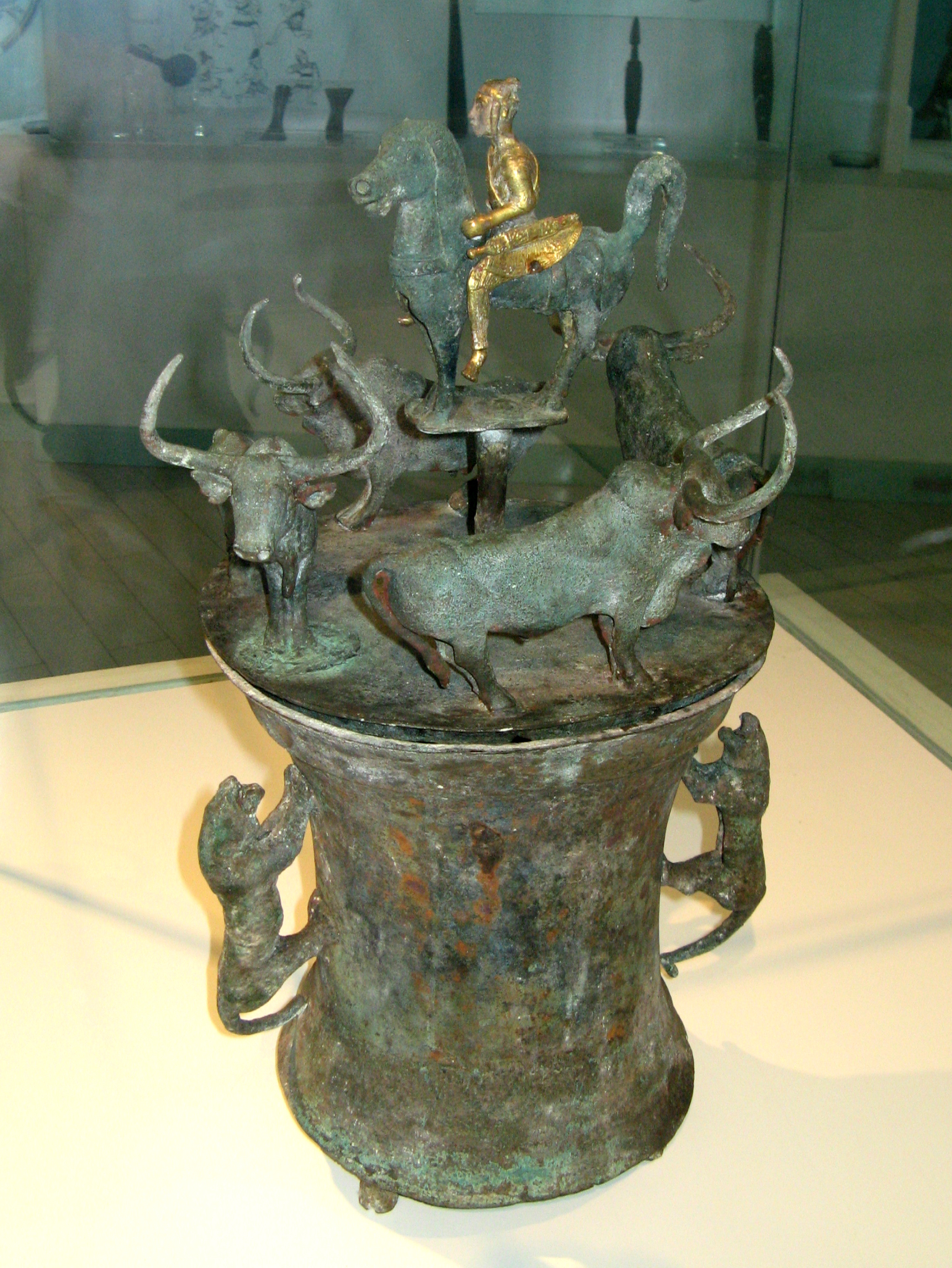
Bronze cowrie container, Western Han dynasty (202 BC – 9 AD), Yunnan Provincial Museum, Kunming; cowrie shells were used as an early form of money in this region of China and were kept in elaborately decorated bronze containers such as this one, surmounted by a freestanding gilded horseman who is encircled by four oxen, that are approached in turn by two tigers climbing up on opposite sides of the container.

This article describes the history of Yunnan (Yunnan–Guizhou Plateau), currently a province of the People's Republic of China.

== Prehistory ==
Notable prehistoric finds include the Yuanmou Man, a Homo erectus fossil unearthed by railway engineers in the 1960s and determined to be the oldest known hominid fossil in China.

== Neolithic ==
By the Neolithic period, human settlements existed in the area of Lake Dian, close to modern-day Kunming, Yunnan's capital. The inhabitants used stone tools and constructed simple wooden structures.

== The Kingdom of Dian ==
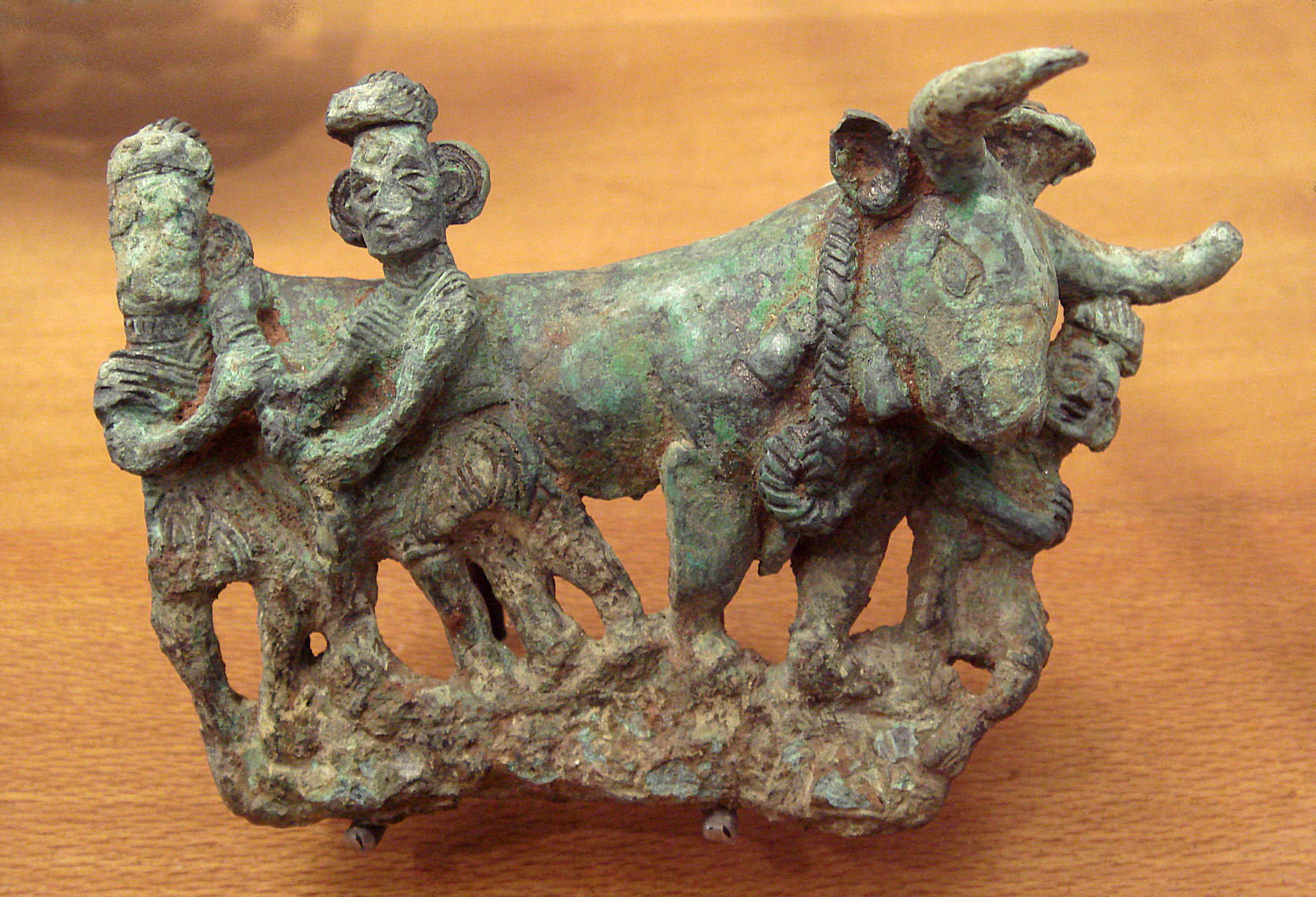
Bronze sculpture of the Dian Kingdom, 3rd century BCE.Yunnan, China.

The Dian culture was distributed around the Lake Dian area and dated, though controversially, between the 6th century BC and the 1st century AD. The culture is divided into an early and a late phase. Under Emperor Wu, a series of military campaigns were dispatched against the Dian during the southward expansion of the Han dynasty. In 109 BC, the kingdom officially became a vassal state of the Han empire.

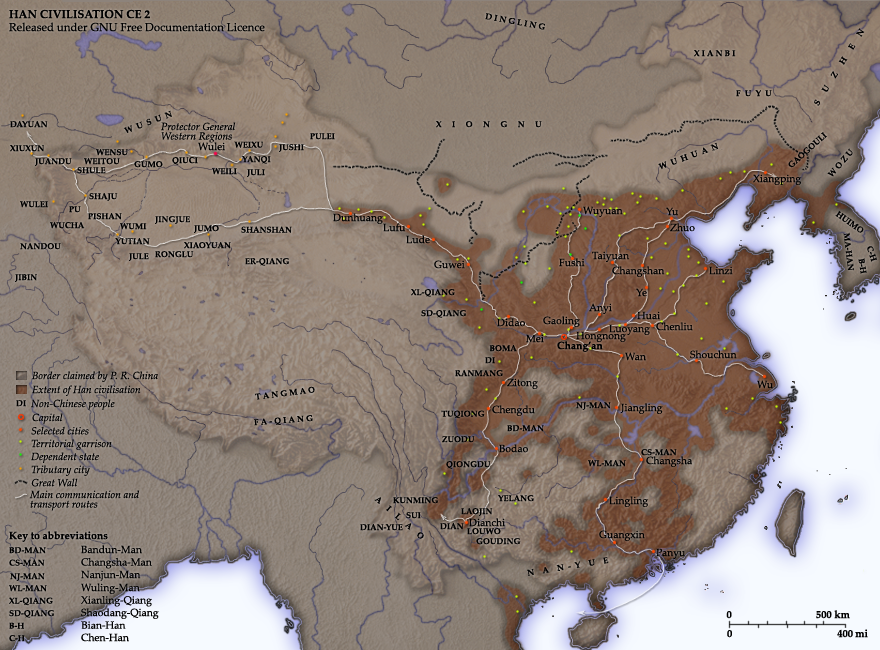
Map of the Chinese Han dynasty, showing some influence on Yunnan's Dian Kingdom, which was situated near modern-day Kunming.

== Han dynasty ==
In 109 BC, Emperor Wu sent General Guo Chang (郭昌) south to Yunnan, establishing the Yizhou commandery. The commandery seat was at Dianchi county (present day Jinning). To expand the burgeoning trade with Burma and India, Emperor Wu also sent Tang Meng (唐蒙) to maintain and expand the Five Foot Way, renaming it "Southwest Barbarian Circuit" (西南夷道). By this time, agricultural technology in Yunnan had markedly improved. The local people used bronze tools, plows and kept a variety of livestock, including cattle, horses, sheep, goats, pigs and dogs. They lived in tribal congregations, sometimes led by exile Chinese.

In the Records of the Grand Historian, Zhang Qian (d. 113 BC) and Sima Qian (145-90 BC) make references to "Sendhuk", which may have been referring to an Indianised community taking the name from the Indus Valley (the Sindh province in modern Pakistan), originally known as "Sindhu" in Sanskrit. When Yunnan was annexed by the Han dynasty, Chinese authorities also reported a Sendhuk" (Indianised) community living in the area.

In 109 AD, the Han court established Yunnan county, a part of Yizhou (益州) commandery. Because the county seat was south of Mount Yun (云山), the county was named "Yunnan" – literally "south of Yun".

== Jin dynasty and the Northern and Southern dynasties period ==
Chinese dynasties of Jin, Liu Song, Southern Qi and Northern Zhou maintain their rules around the commandery in the Kunming area. Southwest Yunnan and the eastern rugged, mountainous areas were still enjoying relative independence, ruled by tribal kings and chieftains with little Chinese influence.

== Nanzhao Kingdom ==
In 649 AD the chieftain of the Yi Mengshe tribe, Xinuluo (細奴邏), founded a kingdom (大蒙國; Dàméngguó) in the area of Lake Erhai. In the year AD 737, Piluoge (皮羅閣) united the six zhaos in succession, establishing a new kingdom called Nanzhao.

In 750, Nanzhao invaded the Tang dynasty. In retaliation, the Tang sent an army against Nanzhao in 751, but this army was soundly defeated at Xiaguan. In 754, another army was sent, this time from the north, but it too was defeated. Bolstered by these successes, Nanzhao expanded rapidly, first into Burma, then into the rest of Yunnan, down into northern Laos and Thailand, and finally, north into Sichuan. In 829, Chengdu was taken; it was a great prize, as it enabled Nanzhao to lay claim to the whole of Sichuan province, with its rich paddy fields.

The Tang dynasty retaliated and by 873, Nanzhao had been expelled from Sichuan, and retreated back to Yunnan. Taking Chengdu marked the high point of the Nanzhao kingdom, and it was a watershed: from then on, the Nanzhao Kingdom slowly declined. n 902, the Nanzhao dynasty was overthrown, and it was followed by three other dynasties in quick succession, until Duan Siping seized power in 937 to establish the Kingdom of Dali.

== Dali Kingdom ==
Dali was a Buddhist Bai kingdom. Established by Duan Siping in 937, it was ruled by a succession of 22 kings until the year 1253, when it was destroyed by an invasion of the Mongol Empire. The capital city was at Dali. In 1274 the Province of Yunnan was created, and the region has since been incorporated within China.

== Yuan dynasty ==
The Mongols established regular and tight administrative control over Yunnan. In 1253 Möngke of the Mongol Empire dispatched the prince Kublai (the eventual founder of the Yuan dynasty) to take Yunnan. The Mongols swept away numerous native kingdoms, including the Dali Kingdom. Later Yunnan became one of the ten provinces set up by Kublai. Kublai Khan appointed Turkmen Sayyid Ajjal Shams al-Din Omar governor in Yunnan in 1273. Before that, the area had been ruled by a local king and a Mongol prince under the Great Khan. The Yuan provincial authorities conferred various titles on many native chieftains, who were obliged to pay taxes. When the Mongols were expelled from China proper in 1368, Yunnan was thrown into chaos and anarchy for a number of years. The Ming dynasty defeated the last of the Yuan loyalists in 1381.

== Ming dynasty ==
The newly proclaimed Ming dynasty did not send armies into Yunnan until 1381. The central government allowed the general Mu Ying, foster son of dynastic founder Zhu Yuanzhang, to set up a hereditary feudatory system in the province. Throughout the Ming, the Mu family developed tremendous influence in Yunnan.

From the end of the 15th century, the Toungoo Dynasty in Myanmar began encroaching on Yunnan. In the 16th century Chen Yongbin, the governor of Yunnan, held back a Myanmar invasion. After the war, he built eight passes along the border in Tengyue subprefecture to mark the demarcation between the two countries.

== Qing dynasty ==
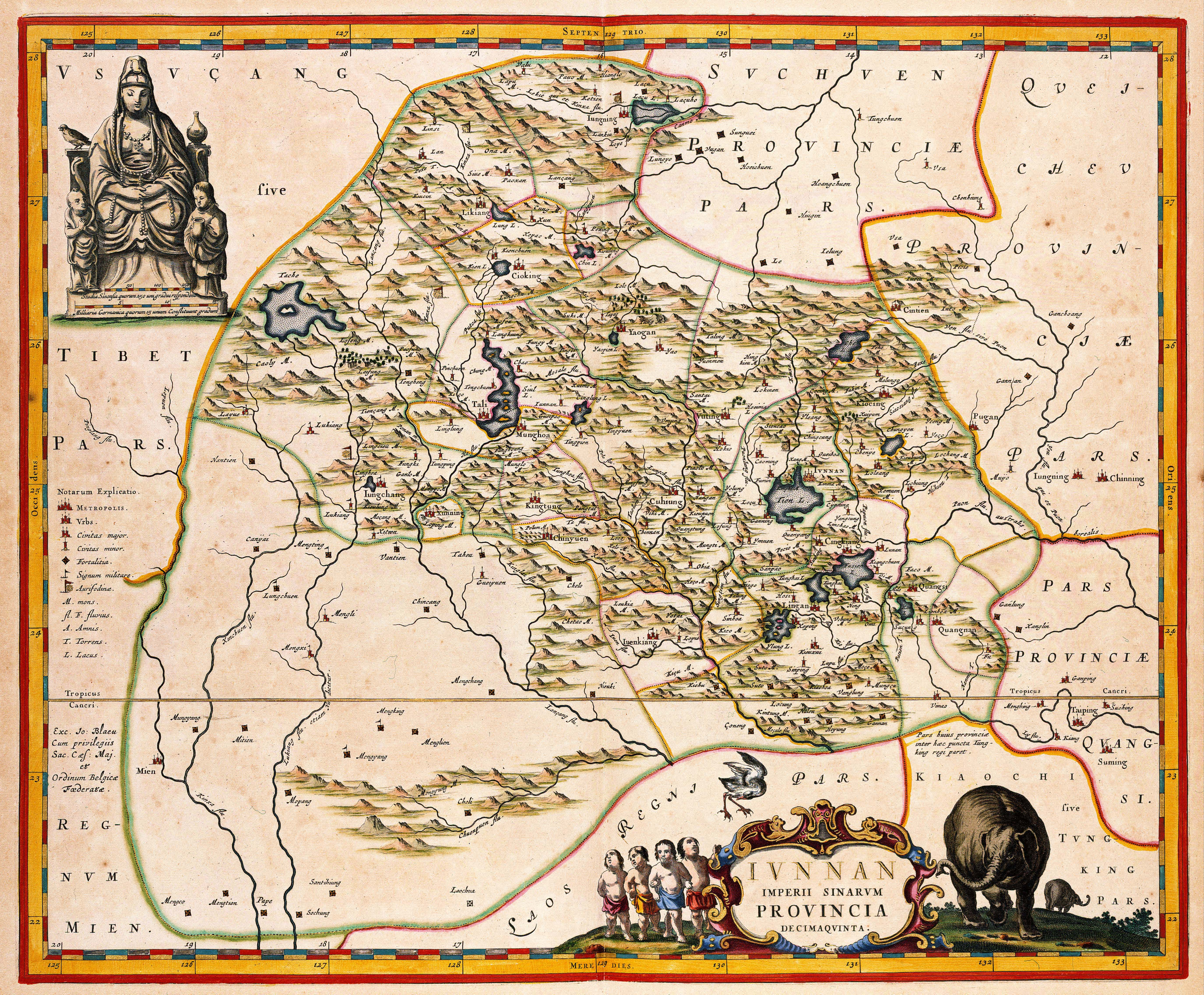
A western drawn 1655 map of Yunnan.

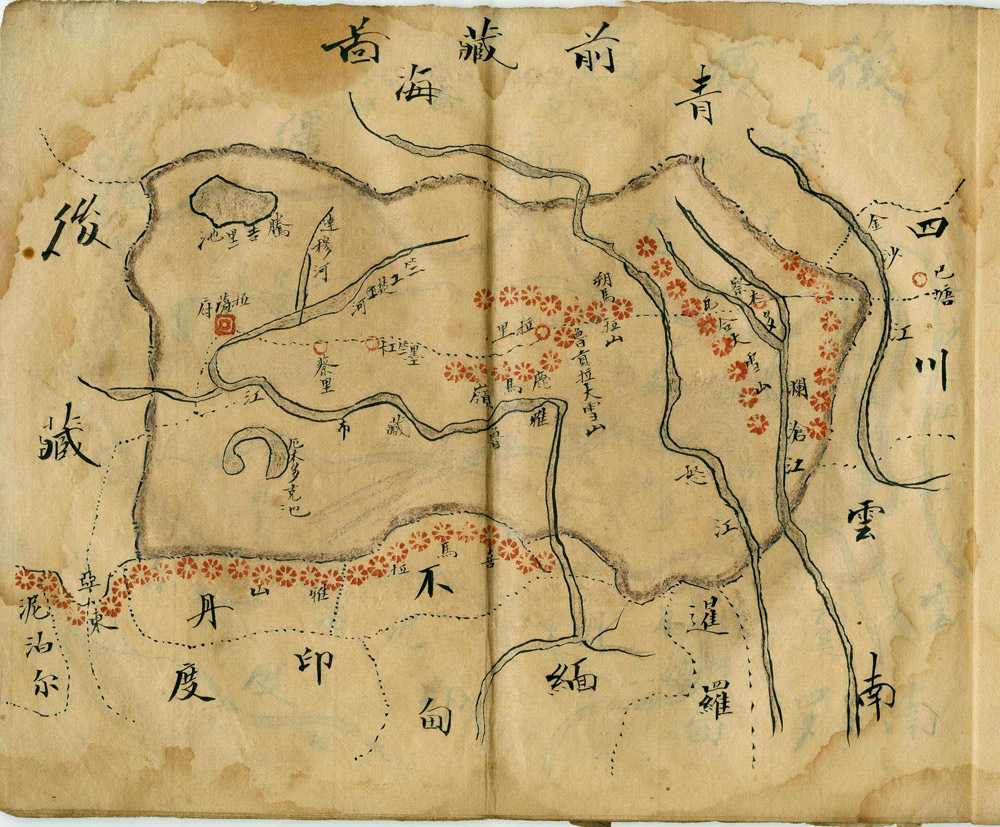
'Front of Tibet' Map Painted by Wu Run-De in the 'Ding Wei' year after 1901, which would have been 1907. Political regions shown clockwise from top are Qinghai, Sichuan, Yunnan, Xianluo (Thailand), Miandian (Burma), Budan (Bhutan), Yindu (India), Nebo'er (Nepal), and so-called 'Houzang' ('back of Tibet'). Note that Thailand, or Tai regions, are shown between Yunnan and Burma, on Yunnan's historically typically ill-defined western border.

After the fall of the Ming in northern China, Yunnan became the last Southern Ming regime headed by Zhu Youlang. Supported by rebel loyalists, he persisted in resistance against the Qing conquest even after the Qing capture of Kunming in 1659. Zhu and his men then fled into Myanmar to seek refuge in Ava, but were treated as prisoners. Zhu's armed followers savaged Upper Myanmar in an attempt to rescue him. General Wu Sangui, then still loyal to the Qing, invaded Myanmar in 1662 with a sizable army, and demanded Zhu's surrender. Although he hesitated, King Pye finally decided to hand Zhu over to avoid hostility. Wu Sangui later turned against the Manchus but died in 1678. Yunnan finally fell to the Qing army in 1681.

== Pingnan Sultanate ==
Waves of conflict between the Muslim Hui people in Yunnan and the Qing government escalated into an all out rebellion in 1856. The rebels in western Yunnan under the leadership of Du Wenxiu became the major military and political center of opposition to the Qing government. They turned their fury on the local mandarins and ended up challenging the central government in Beijing. The rebellion successfully captured the city of Dali, which became the base for the rebels' operations, and they declared themselves a separate political entity from China. The rebels identified their nation as Pingnan Guo (平南国; 'Pacified Southern Kingdom') and Du Wenxiu was styled Qa´id Jami al-Muslimin ('Leader of the Community of Muslims'), but is usually referred to in foreign sources as Sultan, and ruled 1856 – 26 December 1872. The sultanate reached the high-water mark of their power and glory in 1860.

The Sultanate's power declined after 1868. The Chinese Imperial Government had succeeded in reinvigorating itself. By 1871, it was directing a campaign for the annihilation of the obdurate Hui Muslims of Yunnan. Though largely forgotten, the bloody rebellion caused the deaths of up to a million people in Yunnan. Many adherents to the Yunnanese Muslim cause were persecuted by the imperial Manchus. Wholesale massacres of Yunnanese Muslims followed.

For a period of perhaps ten to fifteen years following the collapse of the Panthay Rebellion, the province's Hui minority was widely discriminated against by the victorious Qing, especially in the western frontier districts contiguous with Burma. During these years the refugee Hui settled across the frontier within Burma gradually established themselves in their traditional callings – as merchants, caravaneers, miners, restaurateurs and (for those who chose or were forced to live beyond the law) as smugglers and mercenaries and became known in Burma as the Panthay.

== Republican China ==
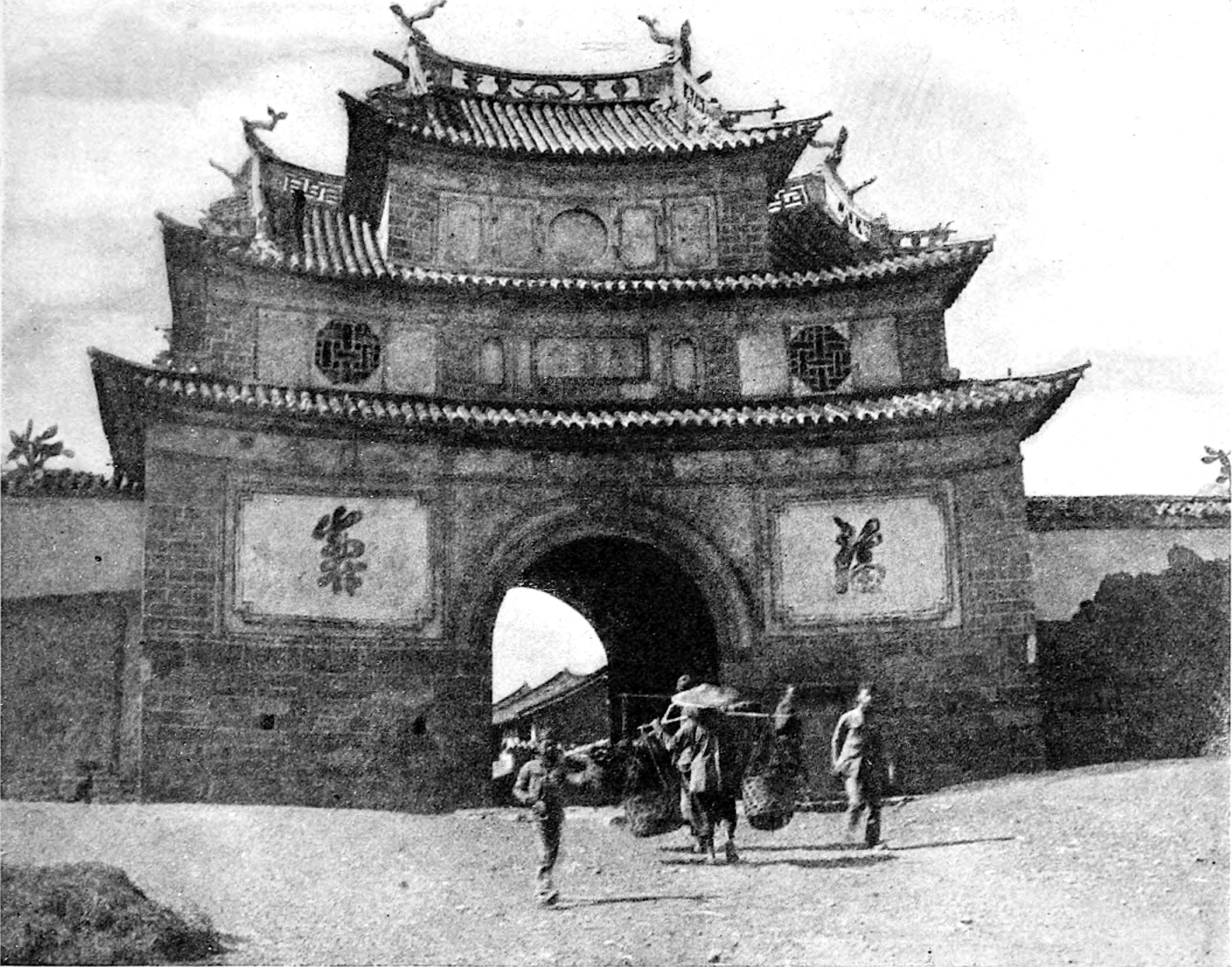
THE GATE OF CHOU-CHOU All of the first and second class cities in Yunnan are surrounded by high walls, and are entered through four or more picturesque gates.

Following the collapse of the Qing Dynasty in 1911, Yunnan came under the control of local warlords, who had more than the usual degree of autonomy due to Yunnan's remoteness. They financed their regime through opium harvesting and traffic.

Cai E is regarded as the founder of the Yunnan clique when at the request of Liang Qichao in 1915, he declared Yunnan's opposition to Yuan Shikai's monarchy. Cai died from natural causes shortly after the successful National Protection War. His chief lieutenant, Tang Jiyao, took over Yunnan and demanded that the National Assembly be restored. When this was accomplished, Yunnan officially reunified with the national government but kept its provincial army separate due to the Beiyang Army's grip in Beijing politics. In 1927, Long Yun seized control of the clique; Tang died shortly after. Long then re-aligned Yunnan under the Nationalist government in Nanjing but stringently guarded the province's autonomy.

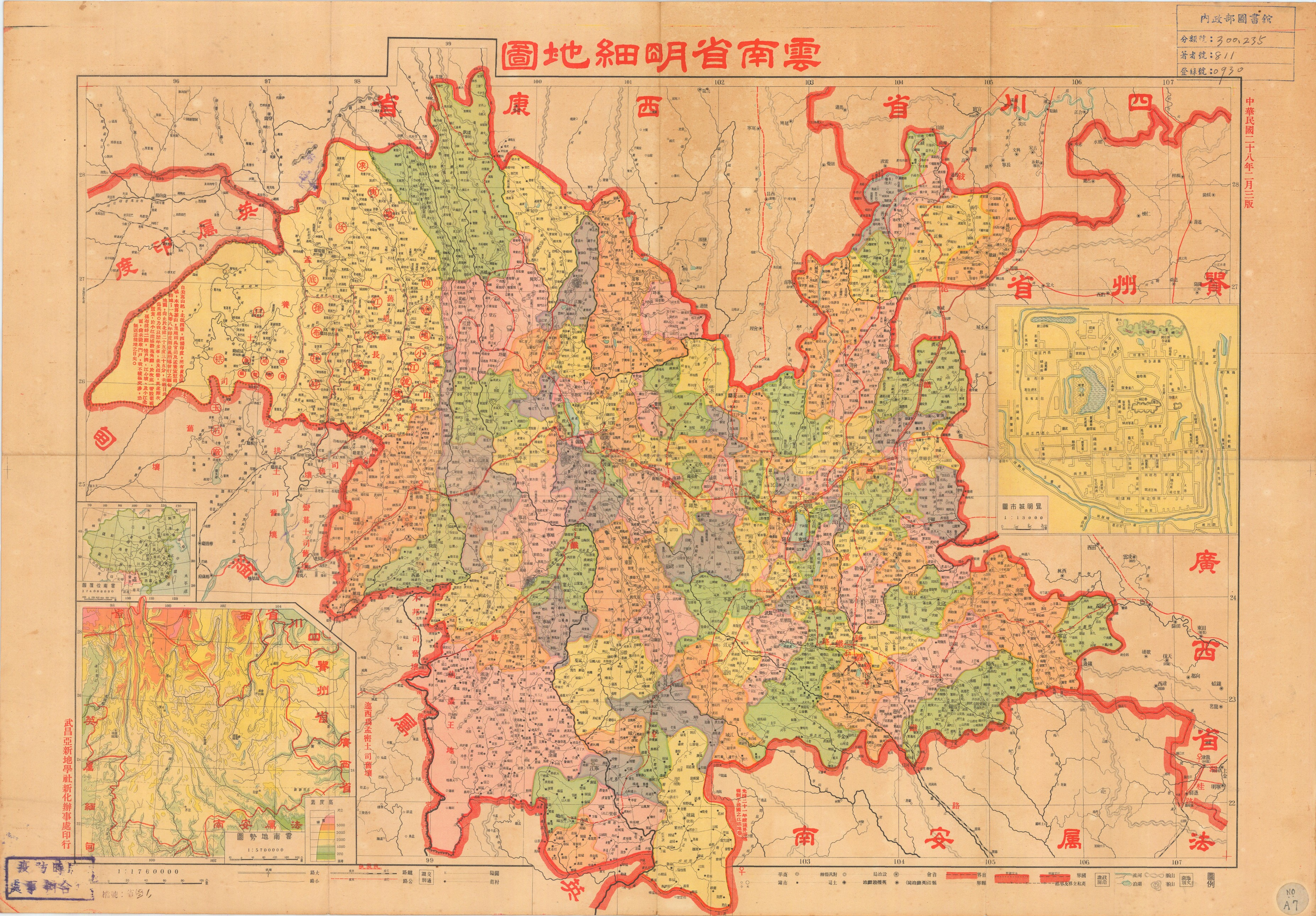
1939 map of Yunnan during ROC era showing Jiangxinpo (shown top left, yellow), Namwan (shown center left, orange and protruding), and Kokang (shown bottom left, red)

In Second Sino-Japanese War, Yunnan served as, among other things, a home base for the Flying Tigers. The Burma Road was constructed, along which supplies travelled into the province and then into the heart of China. In 1942 the Chinese Expeditionary Force entered Burma to fight with the British against the Japanese invasion, eventually fighting to a standstill across the Nu River for 2 years. The province was also a refuge for people, especially university faculty and students, from the east. These had originally retreated to Changsha, but as the Japanese forces were gaining more territory they eventually bombed Changsha in February 1938. The 800 staff faculty and students who were left had to flee and made the 1,000-mile journey to Kunming. It was here that the National Southwest Associated University (commonly known as Lianda) was established. In these extraordinary wartime circumstances for eight years, staff, professors and students had to survive and operate in makeshift quarters that were subject to sporadic bombing campaigns by Japan. There were dire shortages of food, equipment, books, clothing and other essential needs, but they did manage to conduct the running of a modern university. Over those eight years of war (1937–1945), Lianda became famous nationwide for having and producing many, if not most, of China's most prominent academics, scholars, scientists and intellectuals. Both of China's only Nobel laureates in physics studied at Lianda.

After the end of the Second Sino-Japanese War, Long was removed from office. During the Chinese Civil War, Nationalist forces retreated to the southwest provinces of Szechwan, Sikang, and Yunnan. In 9 December 1949, Chairperson of the Provincial Government Lu Han defected to the Communists and most of the Nationalist troops were defeated in the province. Remnants of the Nationalist forces, led by Li Mi and using Mong Hsat as a base, engaged in guerrilla warfare against the Communists, briefly capturing parts of Yunnan territory. In 1951 the provincial government in exile was dissolved and in 1954, Li Mi's remaining troops retreated to Taiwan.

== People's Republic of China ==
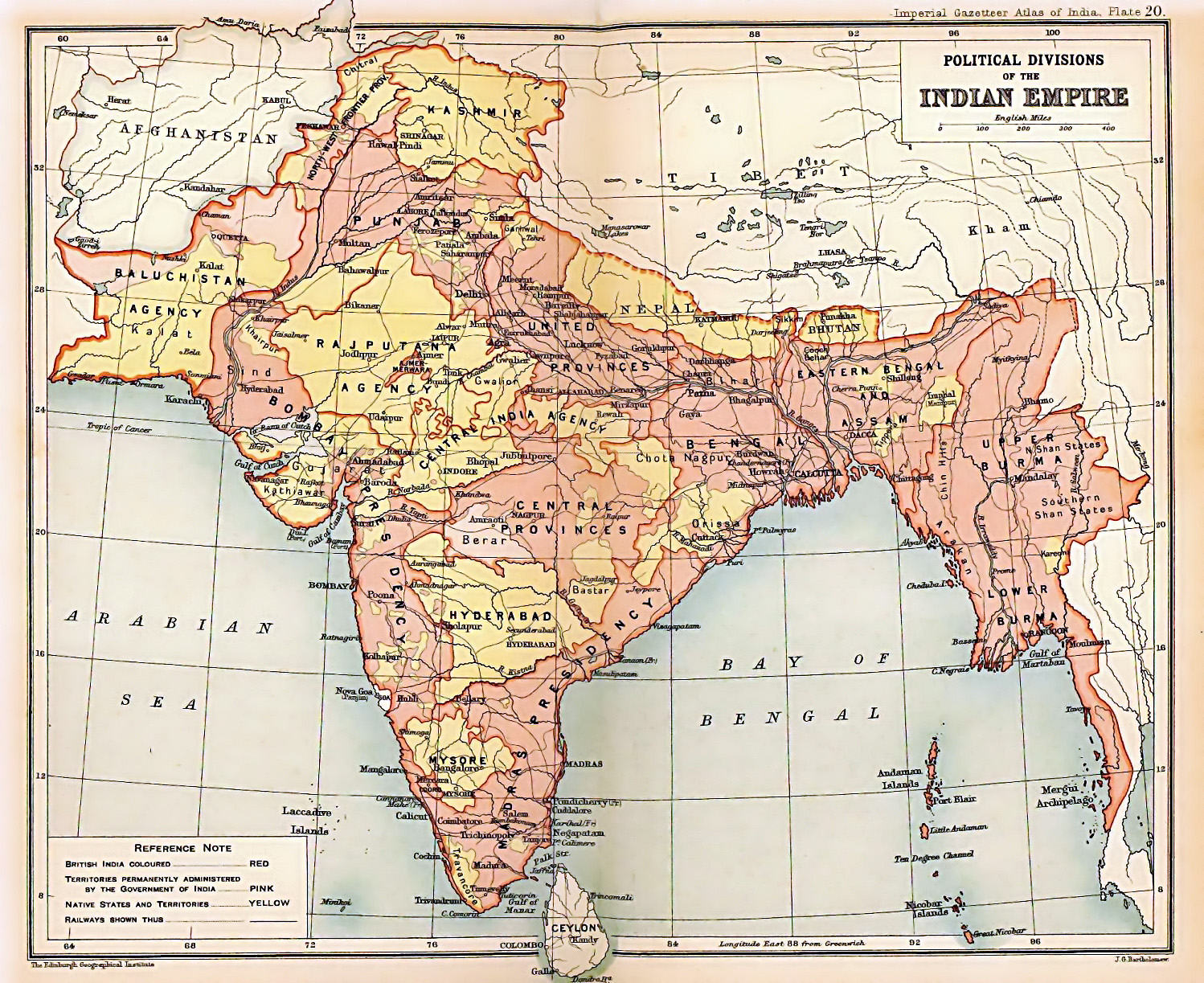
A British 1909 map of British India and Burma showing Yunnan's typically ill-defined south and western borders.

The establishment of the PRC brought gradual but definite consolidation to China's southwestern borders, solidifying what were previously murky claims to various regions.

For example, Colonial French and British had been active at sites in neighbouring northern Laos, Vietnam and Burma, and even inside of modern Yunnan at sites like Tengchong and Gejiu. In fact, between 1904 and 1909 the French had built the 885 km (550 mi)long Sino-Vietnamese Railway which ran from Hanoi to Kunming via Hekou, with an offshoot to Gejiu. The English tried to match the French effort with the Yunnan–Burma Railway, but failed to complete it prior to the outbreak of war, with the project ultimately abandoned.

The PRC also saw a bitter Sino-Vietnamese War fought along Yunnan's south eastern border, which was properly demarcated only on 23 February 2009, with renewed agreements taking effect as late as 14 July 2010.

In the southern region of Xishuangbanna, little or no Han dominance was felt as late as the end of the 19th century. This is illustrated by Otto E. Ehlers' (1855–1895) account of his walk from Rangoon to Jinghong, recording upon his arrival that the annual Chinese tribute mission from northerly Simao was in town and, whilst they were happy to allow him to stay on the south of the Mekong river, he was not to be lent assistance in crossing over. He had no trouble crossing with the aid of a local, regardless.
