= Uzbekistan–Vietnam relations =

- Uzbekistan: Vietnam

Uzbekistan–Vietnam relations are bilateral relations between Vietnam and Uzbekistan. The countries enjoy long relations, on their partly intertwined histories. Uzbekistan has an honorary consulate in Hanoi, while Vietnam is accredited to Uzbekistan through its embassy in Moscow.

== History ==
=== First contact ===
Their relations were first developed during the 13th century, when the Mongol Empire launched three invasions on Đại Việt of the Trần dynasty. The Chagatai Khanate, which consisted of the Karluks that would ultimately birth the modern Uzbeks and Uyghurs and were already Sunni Muslims by this point, also provided several personnel to take part in the invasions, notably being Nasr al-Din and his son Omar (both traced origins from Bukhara, modern-day Uzbekistan), alongside the Uyghur Ariq Qaya; however, none of these invasions succeeded for the Mongols, with many Karluk soldiers of the Mongol realm killed or lost in the wilderness, and a fourth was abandoned following Kublai Khan's death. It was the only connection between the Karluk Turks that became Uzbeks and Uyghurs, and the Vietnamese, for a long time.

=== Soviet era ===
During this time, North Vietnam was under a Soviet-aligned communist regime, while Uzbekistan was under the Soviet rule as Uzbek SSR. North Vietnam's leader Ho Chi Minh paid a personal visit to the Soviet Union in 1959, during which he toured the Uzbek SSR; Uzbek personnel also made up a significant portion of Soviet advisors working in Vietnam during the Vietnam War.

== Modern relations ==
Uzbekistan and Vietnam established diplomatic ties on 17 January 1992. Vietnam has been one of Uzbekistan's most steadfast partners in Southeast Asia; in turn, Uzbekistan also holds an important role for Vietnam's attempts to accelerate trades in Central Asia as Uzbekistan locates at the very heart of it; both nations have signed multiple bilateral agreements since Uzbekistan's independence and Vietnam's economic reforms. In 2024, two-way trade hit US$202 million, surging by 26.5% compared to 2023.

In 2025, the two nations had highlighted the importance of their relations during the visit of Vietnamese legislators to Uzbekistan due to their central position in Southeast Asia and Central Asia, respectively.

=== Tourism ===
Nha Trang and Cam Ranh have been a notable destination for many Uzbek tourists, whose community traced further to the time the Soviet and Russian Armed Forces stationed their troops there; the Uzbek community did not vanish after the Dissolution of the Soviet Union or Russian evacuation in 2002, and has recently experienced growth due to newer arrivals from Uzbek tourists; their arrival also played a role in introducing Hanafi school of Sunni Islam to the country, long dominated by the Chams of Shafi'i school.

Since 2024, Uzbekistan Airways has opened a direct flight between Tashkent to Nha Trang.

== See also ==
- Mongol invasions of Vietnam
