= Tajiks in Uzbekistan =

Ethnic Tajiks living in Uzbekistan

Languages
- Tajik, Bukharian and Uzbek

Religion
- Sunni Islam

Related ethnic groups
- Other Iranian peoples

Tajiks in Uzbekistan are ethnic Tajiks residing in the Republic of Uzbekistan. Tajiks are the second largest ethnic group in Uzbekistan. Most are Sunni Muslims and, according to government estimates, make up 1.7 million people (4.8% of the population, 2021). According to subjective experts, the number of Tajiks in Uzbekistan ranges from 8 to 11 million or 25-30%. For most Tajiks, Uzbek and Russian, the official languages of Uzbekistan, are the primary languages of communication. Tajiks are the indigenous population of the region and have long inhabited the eastern regions of Uzbekistan. While their precise number is debated, it is agreed upon that Tajiks are the second largest ethnic group in Uzbekistan after Uzbeks.

== Uzbekistan ==
Due to assimilation pressures starting in 1924 with the establishment of the Uzbek SSR, many ethnic Tajiks identified themselves as Uzbeks in population censuses and preferred to be registered as Uzbek in their passports to avoid relocation to the less developed agricultural and mountainous regions of the Tajik SSR.

== Population ==
The Statistics Agency of Uzbekistan states the Tajik population to be 4.8%; the cities such as Samarkand and Bukhara have Tajik majority population. According to the ethnographers, Tajiks in the Fergana Valley were concentrated mainly in its western and northwestern parts: Chust, Asht, Sokh and their environs, and they made up 85% of the population of these areas. In the rest of the Fergana Valley, Tajik villages were interspersed among the Uzbek ones.

The increase in the percentage of Tajiks from 3.9% in 1979 to 4.7% in 1989 in the first table can be partly attributed to a change in census instructions. The 1989 census allowed respondents to report their nationality based on ethnic self-identification rather than passport information for the first time.

The official census put Tajik population to be 4.8% population in 2021. Other estimates put the number of Tajiks in Uzbekistan at a much higher 25-30%. While the precise number of Tajiks in Uzbekistan is debated, it is agreed upon that they are the second largest ethnic group in Uzbekistan after Uzbeks.

The official number of Tajiks in Uzbekistan since 1926 (Note: These Numbers come from official Soviet and Uzbek censuses, the numbers these censuses produced are contested)
Year	Number	Percent	Source
1926	350,670	7.4%	
1939	317,560	5.1%	
1959	311,375	3.8%	
1970	457,356	3.8%	
1979	594,627	3.9%	
1989	933,560	4.7%	
2017	1,544,700	4.8%	
2021	1,657,336	4.8%	

The official 2021 number of Tajiks in Uzbekistan per region/republic (Note: These numbers come from the 2021 official Uzbekistan census, the numbers this census produced are contested)
Region of Uzbekistan	Number
Surxondaryo Region	334,120
Samarkand Region	280,447
Namangan Region	255,699
Fergana Region	223,516
Tashkent Region	164,519
Qashqadaryo Region	135,262
Sirdaryo Region	80,018
Bukhara Region	60,898
Andijan Region	39,639
Tashkent (Capital)	35,096
Jizzakh Region	33,051
Navoiy Region	14,355
Khorazm Region	433
Karakalpakstan (Autonomous republic)	283

== Notable people ==
- Sadriddin Ayni, born 1878
- Jalol Ikromi, born 1909
- Mirzo Tursunzoda, born 1911
- Gulchehra Sulaymoni, born 1928
- Asad Gulzoda, born 1935

== See also ==
- Tajikistan–Uzbekistan relations
- Tajiks in Canada
- Tajiks in Pakistan
- Tajiks in China
- History of Bukhara
- Bukharan Jews
- Tajiks in Kazakhstan
- Karakalpakstan
- 2022 Karakalpak protests
