= History of Bukhara =

The history of Bukhara goes back thousands of years, beginning with Indo-Aryan settlement in the region. The city of Bukhara, now the capital of the Bukhara Region (viloyat) of Uzbekistan, is located on the Silk Road and has long been a centre of trade, scholarship, culture, and religion. During the Golden age of Islam, under the rule of Samanids, Bukhara became the intellectual centre of the Islamic world. In medieval times, Bukhara served as the capital of the Khanate of Bukhara and was the birthplace of Imam Bukhari.

UNESCO has listed the historic centre of Bukhara, which contains numerous mosques and madrassas, as one of the World Heritage Sites.

Bukhara functioned as one of the main centres of Persian civilization from its early days in the 6th century BCE. The city's architectural and archaeological sites form one of the pillars of Central Asian history and art. The region of Bukhara had long formed part of the Persian Empire.

== Legends ==
According to the Iranian epic poem Shahnameh, the city was founded by King Siavash, son of Shah Kai Kavoos, one of the mythical Iranian kings of the Pishdadian dynasty. He said that he wanted to create this town because of its many rivers, its hot lands, and its location on the silk road. As the legend goes, Siāvash was accused by his stepmother Sudabeh of seducing her and even attempting to violate her. To test his innocence he underwent trial by fire. After emerging unscathed from amidst the flames, he crossed the Oxus River (now the Amu Darya) into Turan. The king of Samarkand, Afrasiab, to give his daughter, Ferganiza (Persian: فرنگيس Farangis), for Siavash, and further granted him a vassal kingdom in the Bukhara oasis. There he built the Ark or Arg (Persian for 'citadel') and the surrounding city. Some years later, Siavash was accused of plotting to overthrow his father-in-law and become the king of united Iran and Turan. Afrasiab believed this and ordered Siavash's execution in front of Farangis, and buried Siavash's head under the Hay-sellers' Gate. In retaliation, King Kai Kavoos sent Rostam, the legendary super-hero, to attack Turan. Rostam killed Afrasiab, and took Farangis and Siavash's son, Kay Khusrau, back to Persia.

== Archaeology ==
Officially the city was founded in 500 BCE in the area now called the Ark. However, the Bukhara oasis had been inhabited long before. The Russian archaeologist E. E. Kuzmina links the Zaman-Baba culture (Note: Zaman-Baba culture was an early Bronze age culture that demonstrated the early stages of a production economy in the steppe regions of Middle Asia. It is a predecessor of the Andronovo culture.) found in the Bukhara Oasis in the third millennium BCE to the spread of Indo-Aryans across Central Asia. Since 3000 BCE an advanced Bronze Age culture called the Sapalli Culture thrived at such sites as Varakhsha, Vardan, Paykend, and Ramitan. In 1500 BCE a combination of factors—climatic drying, iron technology, and the arrival of Indo-Aryan nomads—triggered a population shift to the oasis from outlying areas. Together both the Sapalli and Indo-Aryan people lived in villages along the shores of a dense lake and wetland area in the Zeravshan Fan (the Zeravshan (Zarafshan) River had ceased draining to the Oxus). By 1000 BCE both groups had merged into a distinctive culture. Around 700 BCE this new culture, called Sogdian, flourished in city-states along the Zeravshan Valley. By this time, the lake had silted up and three small fortified settlements had been built. By 500 BCE these settlements had grown together and were enclosed by a wall, thus Bukhara was born.

== Persian Empires and Kingdom of Bactria ==
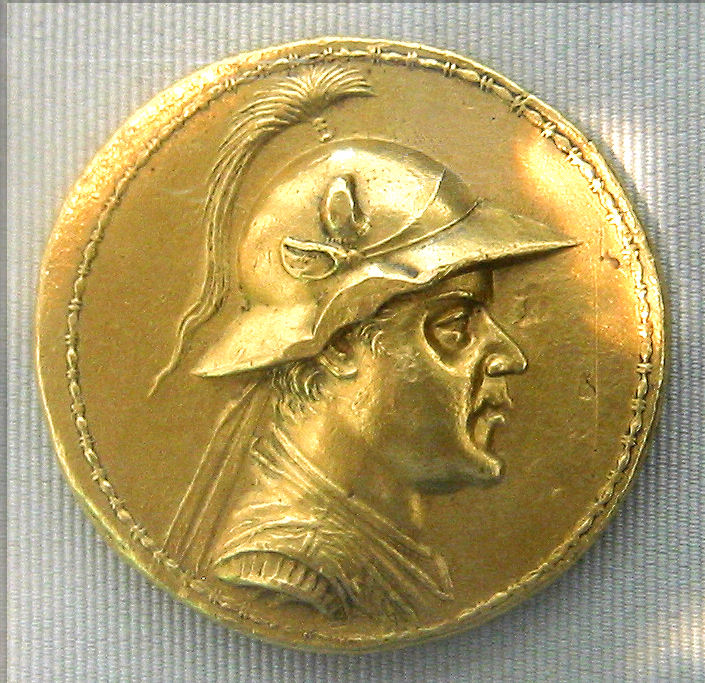
Gold 20-stater of the Greco-Bactrian king Eucratides I (170–145 BCE), the largest gold coin ever minted in antiquity.

Bukhara entered history in 500 BCE as a vassal state or satrapy in the Persian Empire. Later it passed into the hands of Alexander the Great, the Hellenistic Seleucid Empire, the Greco-Bactrians, and the Kushan Empire. During this time, Bukhara functioned as a cult centre for the worship of Anahita, and her associated temple economy. Approximately once a lunar cycle, the inhabitants of the Zeravshan Fan exchanged their old idols of the goddess for new ones. The trade festival took place in front of the Mokh Temple. This festival was important in assuring the fertility of land on which all inhabitants of the delta depended. As a result of the trade festivals, Bukhara became a centre of commerce. The gold 20-stater of the Greco-Bactrian king Eucratides I (170-145 BCE), the largest gold coin ever minted in antiquity weighing 169.2 grams was found in Bukhara. It was later acquired by Napoleon III (Cabinet des Médailles, Paris).

== Sogdiana, Huns and Turkic kaganate ==
Trade accelerated along the Silk Road after the Han dynasty (206 BCE – 220 CE) pushed back the northern tribes to secure this key trading route. The already prosperous city of Bukhara then became the logical choice for a market. The silk trade itself encouraged the rapid growth of the city which ended around 350 CE. After the fall of the Kushan Empire, Bukhara passed into the hands of Hua tribes from the Mongolian steppe and entered a steep decline. However, the 5th century saw an unprecedented growth in urban and rural settlements throughout the entire oasis. Around this time the whole oasis territory was surrounded by a more than 400 km long wall.

Between 563-567, the Turks of the Turkic Kaganate defeated the Hephtalites in a battle near Bukhara and Bukhara became dependent on the Turkic Kaganate.

Information about the rule of the Turks in the ethnopolitical history of Sogdia dates back to the 580s. In 585-586, the Abruy uprising took place in Bukhara, which was suppressed by the Turkic prince Il Arslan. After that, the Turkic ruler Yang Soukh tegin was approved as the owner of the Bukhara oasis. After him Bukhara in 589-603 was ruled by his son Nili. Then his son Basa tegin (603-604) ruled.

Prior to the Arab invasion, Bukhara was a stronghold for followers of two persecuted religious movements within the Sasanian Empire: Manicheanism and Nestorian Christianity. In and around Bukhara many coins have been discovered with Christian symbols such as crosses, dating from around the late seventh or early eighth centuries. Scholars have suggested that due to the large amount of coins Christianity may have been the official religion of the ruling caste. More coins with crosses have been found around Bukhara than anywhere else in Central Asia.

When the Arab armies arrived in 650, they found a multi-ethnic, multi-religious and decentralised collection of peoples, ruled by Bukhar Khudahs ("Lords of Bukhara"), who also controlled the wealthy emporium of Paykand. Nevertheless, after a century many of the subjects of the Caliphate had not converted to Islam, but retained their previous religion. The lack of any central power meant that while the Arabs could gain an easy victory in battle or raiding, they could never hold territory in Central Asia. In fact, Bukhara, along with other cities in the Sogdian federation, played the Caliphate against the Tang dynasty. The Arabs did not truly conquer Bukhara until after the Battle of Talas in 751. Islam gradually became the dominant religion at this time and remains the dominant religion to the present day.

== Early Islamic era ==
Muhammad ibn Jafar Narshakhi in his History of Bukhara (completed in Arabic in 943-44, translated to English in 1954 by Richard N. Frye) states:

In Bukhara there was the bazar of Makh. Twice a year for one day there was a fair. On the day of the fair, people used to sell and buy idols. This practice of selling idols continued even after the Islamic conquest. It was reported that everyday more than 50,000 dirhams were exchanged for the idols. When Muhammad ibn Jafar Narshakhi visited the place, he was astonished that it was allowed. He asked the Sheikhs of Bukhara, and they said as the inhabitants of Bukhara had been idol worshippers in ancient times, it was permitted for them to do so.

The inhabitants of Bukhara became Muslims, but each time after the Muslims withdrew they apostatized. Qutaiba ibn Muslim converted them to Islam three times but they apostatized and became infidels. The fourth time he made war he seized the city and established Islam there after much difficulty ... Qutaiba ibn Muslim built a grand mosque inside the citadel in the year 94/712-3. That place (formerly) had been a temple.

For a century after the Battle of Talas, Islam slowly took root in Bukhara. In 892 Bukhara became the capital of the Samanid Empire, which brought about a revival of Iranian language and culture after the period of Arab domination. While under Samanid control, Bukhara was a rival to Baghdad in its glory. Scholars note that the Samanids revived Persian more than the Buyids and the Saffarids, while continuing to patronise Arabic to a significant degree. Nevertheless, in a famous edict, Samanid authorities declared that "here, in this region, the language is Persian, and the kings of this realm are Persian kings."

During the golden age of the Samanids, Bukhara became the intellectual centre of the Islamic world. Many illustrious scholars lived and worked in Bukhara. Bukhara was a major center of slave trade during the Samanid Empire, when the Samanid slave trade was the main income of the state.

In 999 the Samanids were toppled by the Karakhanid Turkic dynasty.

== Karakhanid and Khorezmshakh periods ==
In 1005 Bukhara was included into the Turkic state of Karakhanids. Karakhanid ruler Arslan Khan ordered the building of one of the most beautiful minarets in the Islamic world, the Minora-i Kalon.

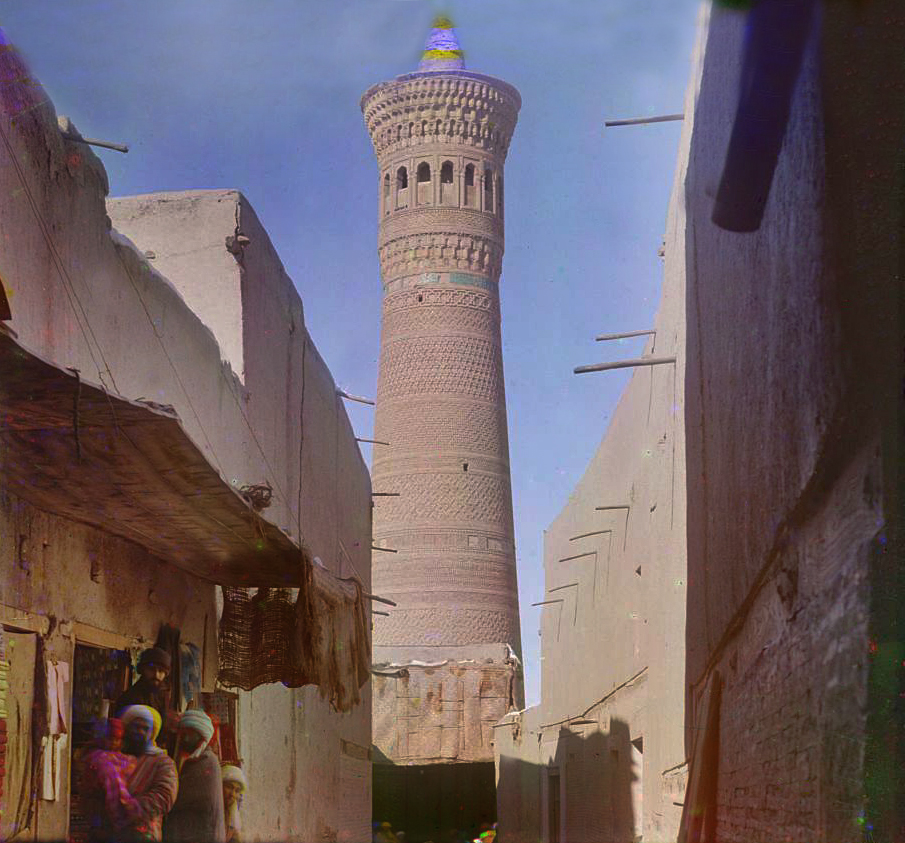
Arslan-khan minaret Minorai Kalon in 1909

In the 11th - first third of the 12th centuries, the Karakhanid rulers rebuilt a number of buildings in Bukhara. Shams al-mulk Nasr b. Ibrahim (1068-1080) rebuilt the burnt cathedral mosque with a minaret between the fortress and the shakhristan, founded a large Shamsabad garden with magnificent buildings near Bukhara, behind the southern gate of Ibrahim.

In the Karakhanid time, the outstanding poet and scientist Omar Khayyam worked for some time in Bukhara at the invitation of the Karakhanid ruler Shams al mulk. Later, Karakhanid Kadyr Khan Dzhabrail b. Togryl-tegin Umar (died in 1102) rebuilt the Kulartakin madrasah in the area of Attaran bazaars and was buried in it.

The Chinese Song dynasty hired Muslim mercenaries from Bukhara to fight against Khitan nomads. 5,300 Muslim men from Bukhara were encouraged and invited to move to China in 1070 by the Song emperor Shenzong to help battle the Liao empire in the north-east and repopulate areas ravaged by fighting. The emperor hired these men as mercenaries in his campaign against the Liao empire. Later on these men were settled between the Sung capital of Kaifeng and Yenching (modern day Beijing). The provinces of the north and north-east were settled in 1080 when 10,000 more Muslims were invited into China. They were led by the Amir of Bukhara, Sayyid "So-fei-er" in Chinese. He is called the "Father" of Chinese Islam. Islam was named by the Tang and Song Chinese as Dashi fa ("law of the Arabs"). He gave Islam the new name of Huihui Jiao ("the Religion of the Huihui").

At the beginning of the 13th century it was invaded by Muhammad II of Khwarezm (1200–1220).

== Mongol era ==
Bukhara was a part of the kingdom of Khwarazm Shahs, who incurred the wrath of the Mongols by killing their ambassador, and in 1220 the city was levelled by Genghis Khan.

Genghis Khan besieged Bukhara for fifteen days in 1220. According to Juvaini, after Genghis Khan took Bukhara "he contented himself with looting and slaughter only once and did not go to the extreme of a general massacre" as he did in Khorasan, although most of the city burned. He chose a moderate path between mercy and punishment because the population readily submitted while the garrison in the citadel resisted. Although he spared most adults, Genghis Khan killed 30,000 Qangli Turks who were "taller than the butt of a whip" on account of their loyalty to Sultan Muhammad, then conscripted all remaining able-bodied men into service.

At the same time that the Mongols brought in Central Asian Muslims to serve as administrators in China proper, the Mongols sent Han and Khitans from China proper to serve as administrators over the Muslim population in Bukhara. The Mongols used foreigners to curtail the power of the local peoples of both lands. Han people were moved into Central Asian areas such as Besh Baliq, Almaliq and Samarqand by the Mongols where they worked as artisans and farmers. The Daoist Chinese master Qiu Chuji travelled through Uzbekistan to meet Genghis Khan in Afghanistan.

After Genghis Khan's death, his son Chagatai and his descendants ruled Bukhara until the emergence of Timur. The city slowly recovered, and was initially part of the Chaghatay Khanate and then the Timurid Empire. Ibn Hawqal gives a detailed account of the chief canals which, starting from the left bank of the Sughd river, watered Bukhara and the gardens in the plain around the city.

When the Moroccan traveller, Ibn Battuta, passed through the region in around 1333 the town had not recovered from being sacked by the Tartar armies. He found that "its mosques, colleges and bazaars are in ruins" and reported that "there is not one person in it today who possesses any religious learning or who shows any concern for acquiring it."

== Khanate of Bukhara ==
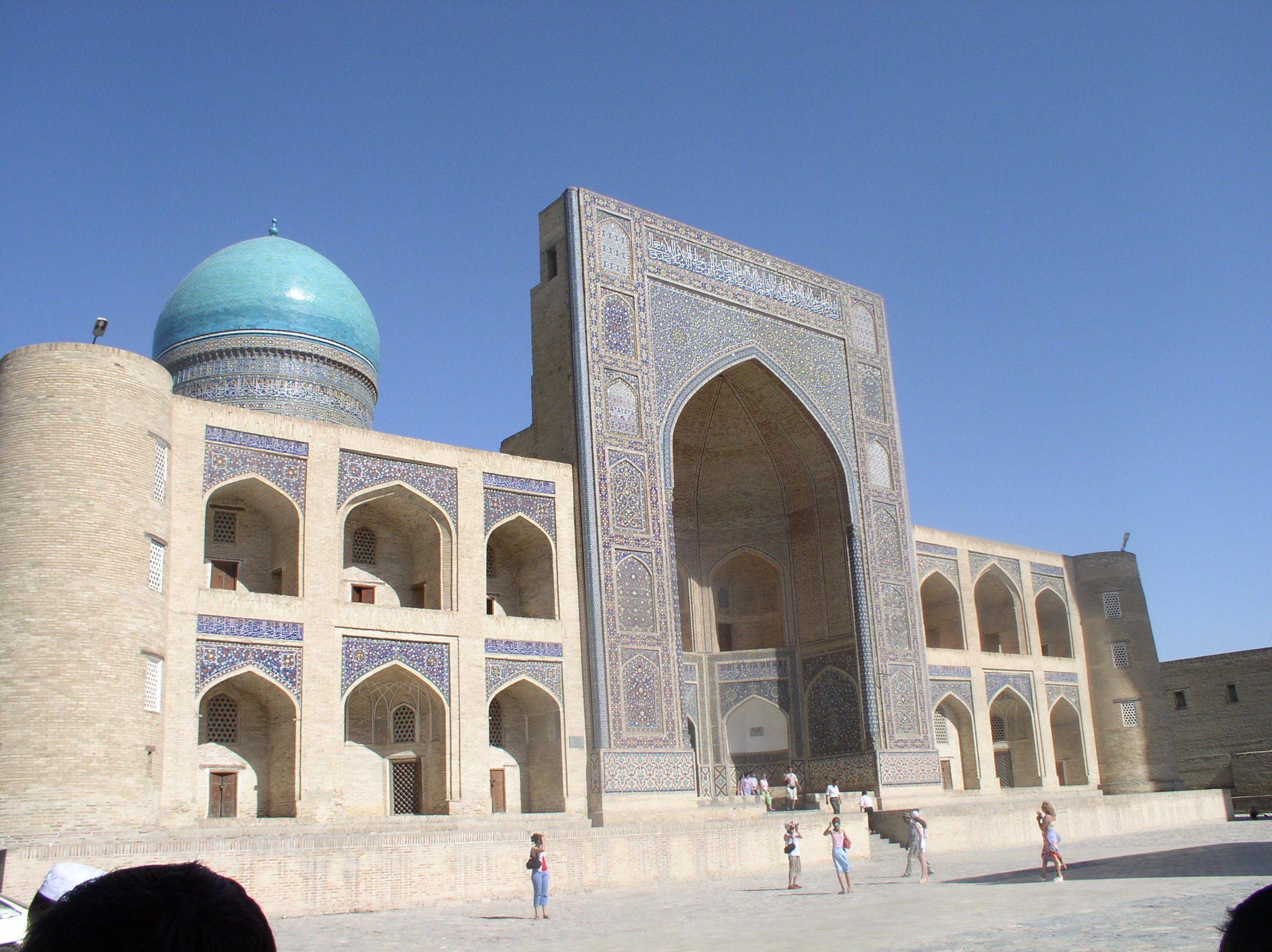
Miri Arab madrasa, 1532, Bukhara

This was a feudal state during the 16th–18th centuries. It received this name when the capital of the Shaybanid state (1506–1598) was moved to Bukhara. It reached its greatest extent and influence under its last Shaybanid ruler, Abdullah Khan II (r. 1577–1598). In 1740 it was conquered by Nadir Shah. After his death, in 1747, the khanate was controlled by the descendants of the Uzbek emir Khudayar Bi, through the prime ministerial position of ataliq. In 1785, his descendant, Shah Murad, formalized the family's dynastic rule (Manghit dynasty), and the khanate became the Emirate of Bukhara.

== Emirate of Bukhara (1785–1920) ==
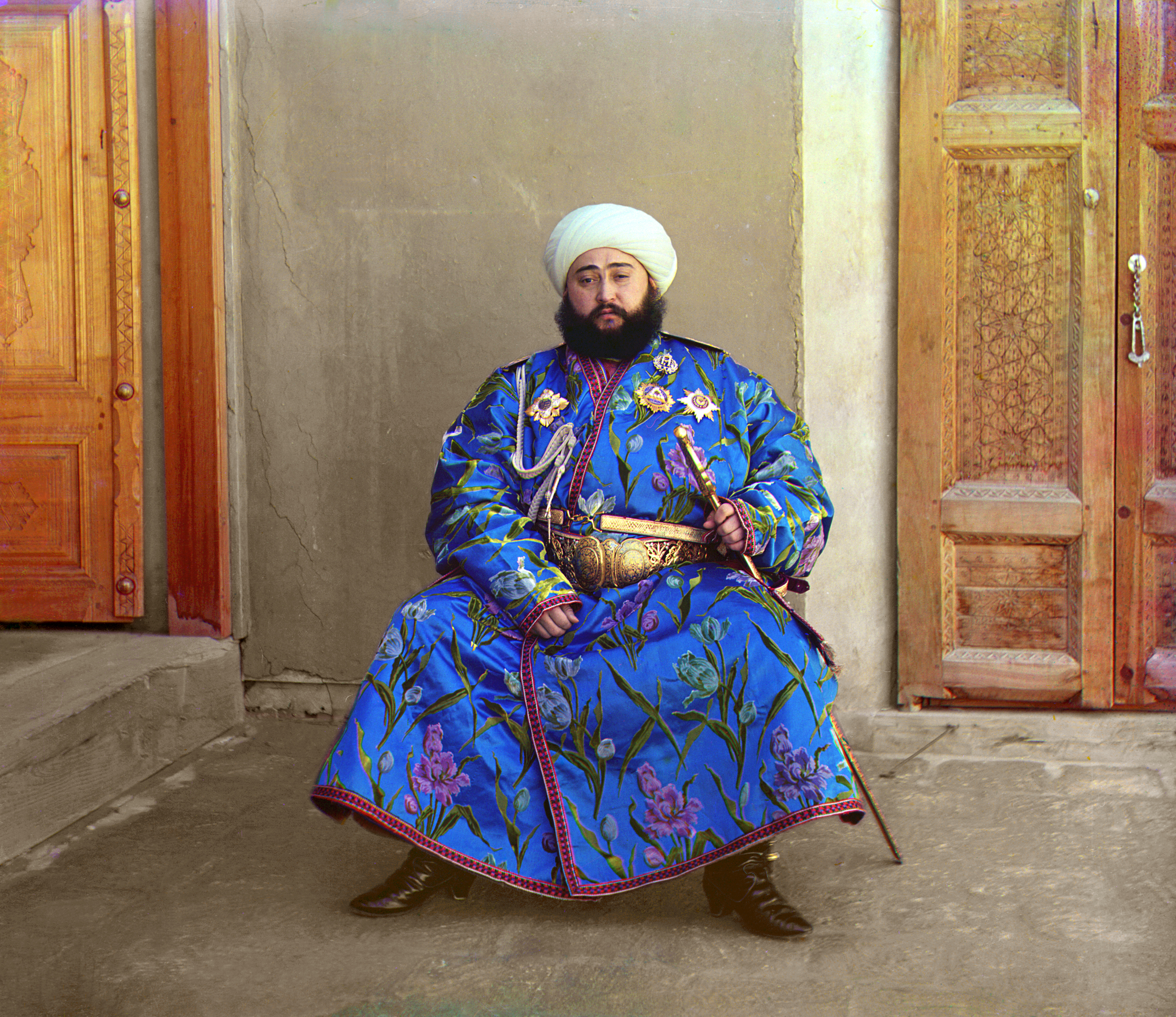
Alim Khan (1880–1944), last emir of Bukhara, deposed in 1920

Bukhara played a role in The Great Game between the Russian and the British Empires. Charles Stoddart and Arthur Conolly were imprisoned there by the Emir, first thrown into a vermin pit for months, and then beheaded outside the Citadel. Joseph Wolff, known as the Eccentric Missionary, escaped a similar fate when he came looking for them in 1845. Eventually it became a colonial acquisition of the Russian Empire.

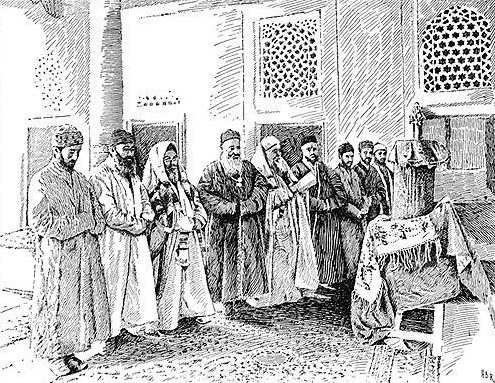
Big synagogue of Bukhara. 1901—1906

In the 19th century, Bukhara continued to play a significant part in regional cultural and religious life. The French Orientalist Jean Jacques Pierre Desmaisons visited the city disguised as a Muslim merchant in 1834. For several centuries, the cities of Bukhara and Khiva were known as major centers of the slave trade, and the Bukhara slave trade, alongside the neighboring slave trade in Khiva, has been referred to as the "slave capitals of the world".

The last Emir of Bukhara was Muhammad Alim Khan (1880–1944). The Trans-Caspian railway was built through the city in the late 19th century. The nearest station is at Kagan, a dozen miles away, but the emir had a private spur built to Bukhara itself.

== Russian Revolution and later ==
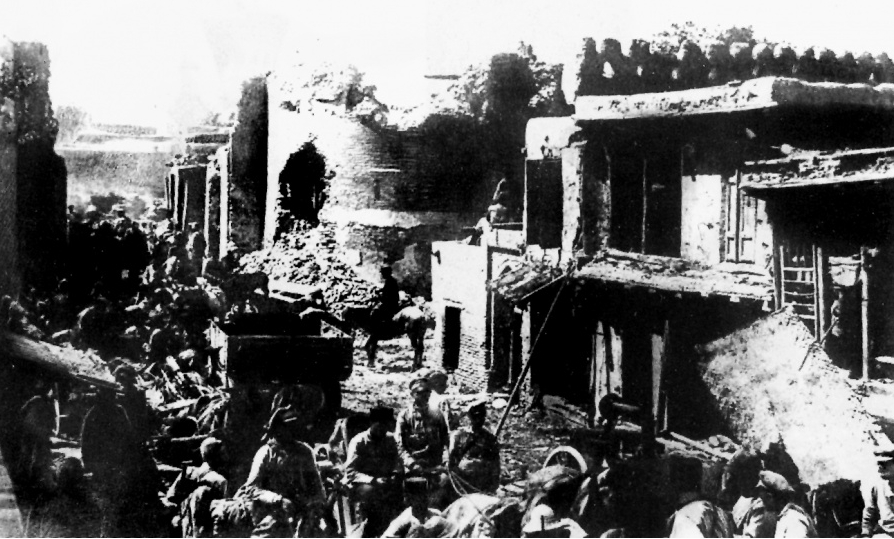
Red Army troops entering old Bukhara after besieging the city.

The Bukharan People's Soviet Republic existed from 1920 to 1924, when the city was integrated into the Uzbek Soviet Socialist Republic. Fitzroy Maclean, then a young diplomat in the British Embassy in Moscow, made a surreptitious visit to Bokhara in 1938, sight-seeing and sleeping in parks. In his memoir Eastern Approaches, he judged it an "enchanted city", with buildings that rivalled "the finest architecture of the Italian Renaissance". In the latter half of the 20th century, the War in Afghanistan and Civil war in Tajikistan brought Persian-speaking refugees into Bukhara and Samarkand. After integrating themselves into the local Tajik population, these cities face a movement for annexation into Tajikistan, with which the cities have no common border.

== See also ==
- Tajiks of Uzbekistan
