= Dai Paxi =

Muslim subgroup of the Dai people in Yunnan, China

帕西傣

Regions with significant populations
- Xishuangbanna, Yunnan

Languages
- Dai languages (Tai Lü), Mandarin Chinese, some Arabic for religious purposes

Religion
- Predominantly Sunni Islam

Related ethnic groups
- Dai people, Hui people, other Chinese Muslim groups

The Dai Paxi (帕西傣), also called Dai Hui (回傣), are a small ethnoreligious group in Xishuangbanna Dai Autonomous Prefecture, Yunnan, China. They are a branch of the broader Dai people who primarily converted to Islam through historical contact with Hui Muslim traders. The community blends Dai ethnic culture with Islamic religious practices, forming a distinctive identity.

== Etymology ==
The name Paxi or Pashi or Parshi is believed to derive from Burmese or Tai-language ethnonyms used for Muslims. Burmese communities referred to Yunnanese Hui traders as Panthay, while Shan communities used the term Pansee; among the Dai, Parshi became associated with Muslims, particularly those who abstained from pork.

== History ==
According to local genealogies and oral traditions preserved in Manluan village, the first Hui settler was a caravan merchant surnamed Ma from Weishan County in Dali Prefecture. During the Jiaqing and Daoguang eras of the Qing dynasty, amid unrest preceding the rebellion of Du Wenxiu, the merchant was reportedly robbed while travelling through Xishuangbanna and became unable to return home. He subsequently sought permission from a local Dai hereditary headman to settle near the Liusha River, where the Hui village of Manluan later developed.

Local tradition states that the Dai chief agreed on three conditions: the newcomer was required to respect Dai customs, obey local authority, and marry a Dai woman. The merchant accepted these conditions and married Yuwen, the daughter of a nearby Dai headman. Their descendants later formed the nucleus of the Dai Paxi community. Early intermarriage between Hui settlers and Dai women became a defining feature of the community's formation and helped integrate the newcomers into Dai society while also establishing alliance ties with local rulers.

During the first three generations, the descendants of the original settlers married primarily with neighbouring Dai communities. Genealogical records indicate that many early marriages linked Hui settlers with the daughters of Dai village headmen. Although the community retained Islamic religious customs, it gradually adopted many elements of Dai culture, including the Dai language, clothing styles, cuisine, architectural forms, and local naming customs. At the same time, the community continued to observe Islamic practices such as halal dietary restrictions, mosque worship, fasting during Ramadan, Qur'anic recitation, and Islamic burial rites.

As the Dai Paxi population expanded, endogamy within the Muslim community became increasingly common from approximately the fourth generation onward. During the late Qing dynasty and Republican period, the expansion of caravan trade brought additional Hui merchants and settlers from Yuxi, Tonghai, Eshan, Xinping, and Shadian into Xishuangbanna. Contact with these Hui communities strengthened Islamic consciousness among the Dai Paxi and encouraged marriages with Hui Muslims from outside the villages. By the fifth generation, marriage with fellow Muslims had become the preferred ideal within the community.

The increasing practice of endogamy within a relatively small population also produced social and health concerns associated with close-kin marriages. Beginning in the 1980s, improvements in transportation, education, and communication widened marriage networks beyond the traditional village community. Paxi Dai increasingly married Hui, Dai, Han, and members of other ethnic groups from across Yunnan and neighbouring regions. Young villagers, particularly women, travelled to major Hui centres such as Shadian and Najiaying for Islamic education, after which some married Hui Muslims from other areas.

During the late twentieth century, broader Islamic revival movements among the Hui of Yunnan also influenced the Dai Paxi. Hui religious teachers and missionaries from other parts of Yunnan visited Manluan and Mansai, rebuilt mosques, promoted Qur'anic education, and encouraged stricter observance of Islamic practices. Islamic festivals such as Eid al-Fitr, Eid al-Adha, and Mawlid al-Nabi became more publicly celebrated, and Hui communities from other parts of Yunnan participated in village ceremonies.

The revival of religious life contributed to a strengthened ethnic consciousness among the Paxi Dai. Villagers reconstructed genealogies and traced their ancestral origins to Hui communities in Dali Prefecture. In 2005, representatives from Manluan reportedly travelled to Weishan and Binchuan in search of their ancestral homeland. At the same time, the community increasingly emphasized its dual cultural heritage by combining Islamic and Dai elements in architecture and public symbolism. Newly built houses and mosques incorporated Arabic inscriptions and dome structures alongside traditional Dai architectural features.

Scholars have described the Paxi Dai as one of several “cross-ethnic” Muslim communities in Yunnan that emerged through trade, migration, and intermarriage between Hui Muslims and neighbouring ethnic groups. The community has frequently been cited in studies of Muslim identity in China as an example of the coexistence of Islamic religious identity with extensive cultural assimilation into local non-Muslim societies. Researchers have argued that the history of the Paxi Dai challenges simplistic models of either complete assimilation or complete separation between Hui Muslims and surrounding ethnic groups in southwest China.

== Culture ==
The Dai Paxi maintain a distinctive blend of Dai culture and Islamic religious practices.

=== Language and Education ===
They primarily speak the Tai Lü dialect of Dai, and are bilingual in Mandarin Chinese. Arabic is taught in Islamic schools and mosques for reading the Qur’an.

=== Dress and Appearance ===
Traditional dress among the Dai-Hui closely resembles that of the Dai people. Women commonly wear fitted blouses and straight skirts characteristic of Dai clothing traditions. However, some women who have studied Islamic scriptures outside the village wear long-sleeved garments and the hijab in accordance with broader Hui Muslim practices.

=== Food and Diet ===
Their cuisine combines Dai culinary traditions with Islamic dietary laws. Community members observe halal dietary restrictions and abstain from pork consumption. Sticky rice, spicy and sour foods, and other Dai-style dishes remain common within the community.} Historically, some villagers consumed duosheng, a dish prepared from raw beef mixed with vegetables and spices, although the practice has become less common in recent decades.

=== Religious Practices and Festivals ===
Mosques are the focal points of the community. Sunni Islam is practiced communally, including daily prayers, Ramadan, and festivals such as Eid al-Fitr and Eid al-Adha. Buddhist festivals like the Water-Splashing Festival are not observed.

=== Arts and Social Life ===
The Dai Paxi preserve traditional Dai arts, including weaving, embroidery, music, and storytelling, sometimes adapted to Islamic norms. Community gatherings occur in mosques or communal halls.

=== Marriage and Social Organization ===
Marriage is often endogamous within the community or with Hui Muslims. Villages are organized around kinship networks and religious leadership from elders and imams.

== Distribution ==
The Paxi community traces its origins to a Hui trader from Weishan in Dali, Yunnan, settled in areas like Manluan Hui (曼峦回) and Mansai Hui (曼赛回) villages, establishing communities that integrated with the local Dai population. The community is also known locally as Paxi Dai Village, meaning "Dai people who believe in Islam." Population estimates are in the low thousands. They are officially classified under the Dai nationality.

== Contemporary Issues ==
- Cultural preservation: There is concern among older Paxi that younger generations may drift away from Islamic observance, or assimilate into mainstream Dai or Han Chinese ways. Efforts exist locally to preserve the unique religious and cultural heritage.
- Recognition: Their unique identity is not well known outside their villages; some local tourism or cultural publicity has tried highlighting "Dai Muslim" or "Paxi Dai" culture as part of the diversity of the Dai region.

== See also ==
- Dai people
- Hui people
- Panthays
- Islam in China
