= Su fei-erh =

Muslim Song dynasty politician

- Traditional Chinese: 所非爾
- Simplified Chinese: 所非尔
Transcriptions
Standard Mandarin
- Hanyu Pinyin: Sū Fēi'ěr
- IPA: [sú féɪ.àɚ]
Yue: Cantonese
- Jyutping: sou1 fei1ji5
- IPA: [sɔw˥ fej˥.ji˩˧]

Su fei-erh (Note: Also romanised as Su Fei'er or So-fei-er.) (Chinese: 所非爾) was a Muslim Bukharan Emir who was invited into China by the Song dynasty Emperor and given a title of Prince by the Chinese Emperor. He played a critical role in forming the Muslim Hui people in China and giving the Islamic religion its current name in Chinese.

== Name ==
Su fei-erh was his name in Chinese; Su Fei'er and So-fei-er are other romanisations of his name. His name has variously been reconstructed in his original language as Safar, Sufair, or Zubair.

== Life ==
The Song dynasty hired Muslim warriors from Bukhara to fight against Khitan nomads. 5,300 Muslims from Bukhara were encouraged and invited to move to China in 1070 by the Song emperor Shenzong to help battle the Liao empire in the northeast and repopulate areas ravaged by fighting. The emperor hired these men as mercenaries in his campaign against the Liao empire. Later on these Muslims were encouraged to settle between the Song capital of Kaifeng and Liao capital of Yanjing (modern day Beijing) in order to create a buffer zone. China's northern and northeastern provinces were settled by Muslims in 1080 when 10,000 Muslim women and men were invited into China. (Note: Israeli (2002), p. 283–284: "During the Sung (Song) period (Northern Sung, 960-1127, Southern Sung, 1127-1279) we again hear in the Chinese annals of Muslim mercenaries. In 1070, the Song emperor, Shen-tsung (Shenzong), invited a group of 5,300 young Arabs, under the leadership of Amir Sayyid So-fei-er (this name being mentioned in the Chinese source) of Bukhara, to settle in China. This group had helped the emperor in his war with the newly established Liao Empire (Khitan) in northeastern China. Shen-zong gave the prince an honorary title, and his men were encouraged to settle in the war-devastated (sic) areas in northeastern China between Kaifeng, the capital of the Sung, and Yenching (Yanjing) (today's Peking or Beijing) in order to create a buffer zone between the weaker Chinese and the aggressive Liao. In 1080, another group of more than 10,000 Arab men and women on horseback are said to have arrived in China to join So-fei-er. These people settled in all the provinces of the north and northeast, mainly in Shan-tung (Shandong), Ho-nan (Hunan), An-hui (Anhui), Hu-pei (Hubei), Shan-hsi (Shanxi), and Shen-hsi (Shaanxi) ... So-fei-er was not only the leader of the Muslims in his province, but he acquired the reputation also of being the founder and "father" of the Muslim community in China.") They were led by the Amir of Bukhara, Sayyid "So-fei-er" in Chinese. He is called the "Father" of Chinese Islam. Islam was named by the Tang and Song Chinese as the "law of the Arabs" (Dàshí fǎ 大食法). (Note: Dàshí derived from the Chinese rendering of Tazi — the name the Persian people used for the Arabs.) Su fei-erh gave Islam the new name of "the religion of the Huihui" (Huíhuí-jiào 回回教). (Note: Israeli (2002), p. 284: "..misnamed by the Tang and Song Chinese as Ta-shi kuo (Dashi guo) ("the land of the Arabs") or as Ta-shi fa (Dashi fa) ("the religion, or law, of Islam"). This was derived from the ancient Chinese name for Arabia, Ta-shi (Dashi), which remained unchanged even after the great developments in Islamic history since that time. He then introduced Hui Hui Jiao (the Religion of Double Return, which meant to submit and return to Allah), to substitute for Dashi fa, and then replaced Dashi Guo with Hui Hui Guo (the Islamic state). This in Chinese Hui Hui Jiao was universally accepted and adopted for Islam by the Chinese, Khiran, Mongols, and Turks of the Chinese border lands before the end of the eleventh century.")

== Descendants ==
Many of Su fei-erh's descendants have wielded political power and prestige from the 12th century to the 19th century. One of the sons of Su fei-erh was appointed governor of Shandong while a grandson called Shams Shah was given the title of "Protector of the Tatars". Kamal al-Din, a great grandson, was made commander-in-chief of the army under Emperor Gaozong. In turn, Kamal's son Mahmud served as governor of Yunnan and Shaanxi. Further descendants were also appointed into high positions within the Song dynasty.

Su fei-erh is said by the Fa-hsiang to be the ancestor of Sayyid Ajjal Shams al-Din Omar (who was descended from Muhammad); some say this claim and was a forgery to mask Sayyid Ajjal's arrival to China with the Mongols. (Note: Houtsma, Wensinck & Gibb (1993), p. 847: "Cingiz Khan took as one of his officers a man who was said to come from Bukhara and claimed to be a descendant of the Prophet, namely Shams al-Din 'Omar, known as Saiyid-i Adjall ... with notices of his sons Nasir al-Din, the Nescradin of Marco Polo, and Husain ... According to Fa-Hsiang, Saiyid-i Adjall was the fifth descendant of a certain Su fei-erh (Sufair?) and 26th in line from the Prophet ... appointed him governor of Yunnan to restore order there. He was afterwards also given the honorary title "Prince of Hsien Yang". He left five sons and nineteen grandsons. Lepage rightly doubts the authenticity of the genealogical table in Fa-Hsiang ... According to the usual statements Saiyid-i Adjall came originally from Bukhara and governed Yunnan from 1273 till his death in 1279; he was buried in Wo-erh-to near his capital. His tomb here with its inscriptions was first discovered by the d'Ollone expedition and aroused great interest particularly as there was a second tomb, also with inscription, in Singan-fu. It has now been ascertained that the second grave in Shensi is a cenotaph which only contained the court-dress of the dead governor ... Among the further descendants may be mentioned Ma Chu (c. 1630–1710) (in the fourteenth generation) who was a learned scholar and published his famous work "The Magnetic Needle of Islam" in 1685; he supervised the renovation of the tomb and temple of his ancestor Saiyid-i Adjall; one of the inscriptions on the tomb is by him. The present head of the family is Na Wa-Ch'ing, Imam of a mosque in the province (d'Ollone, p. 182)")

== See also ==
- History of Bukhara
- Hui people
- Islam during the Song dynasty
- Sayyid Ajjal Shams al-Din Omar
- Western Regions
