= Ajall Shams al-Din Omar =

Governor of Yunnan (1211–1279)

Sayyid Ajall Shams al-Din Omar
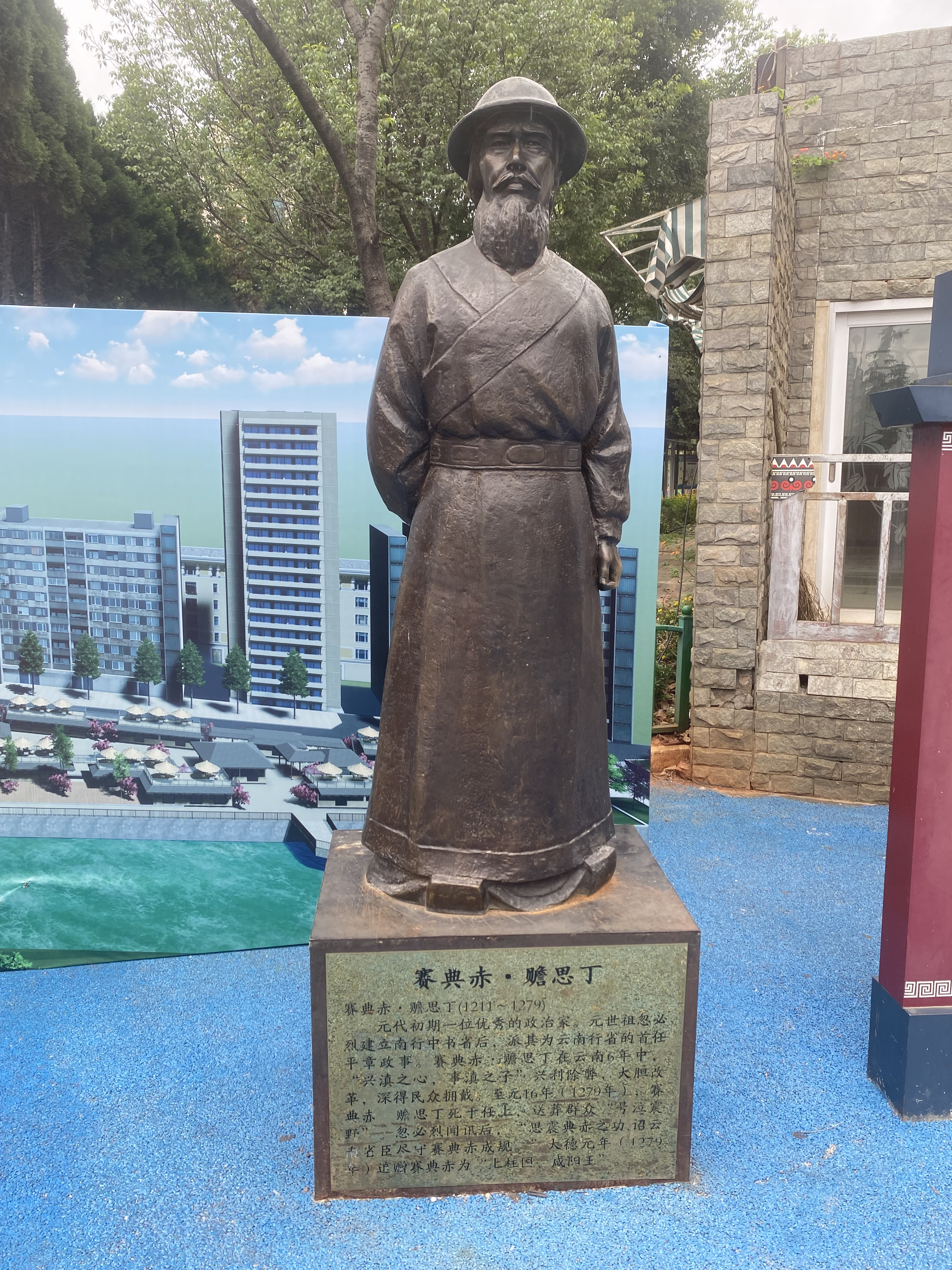

Governor of Yunnan (Karadjang)
- In office 1274 – 21 August 1279
- Preceded by: Newly created position (previous ruler was Duan Xingzhi as Emperor of Dali)
- Succeeded by: Nasr al-Din

Personal details
- Born: 1211 Bukhara, Khwarazmian Empire
- Died: 21 August 1279 Yunnan, Yuan China
- Children: Nasr al-Din, Hassan, Hussein, Shamsddin Omar, Mas'ud

Military service
- Allegiance: Yuan dynasty

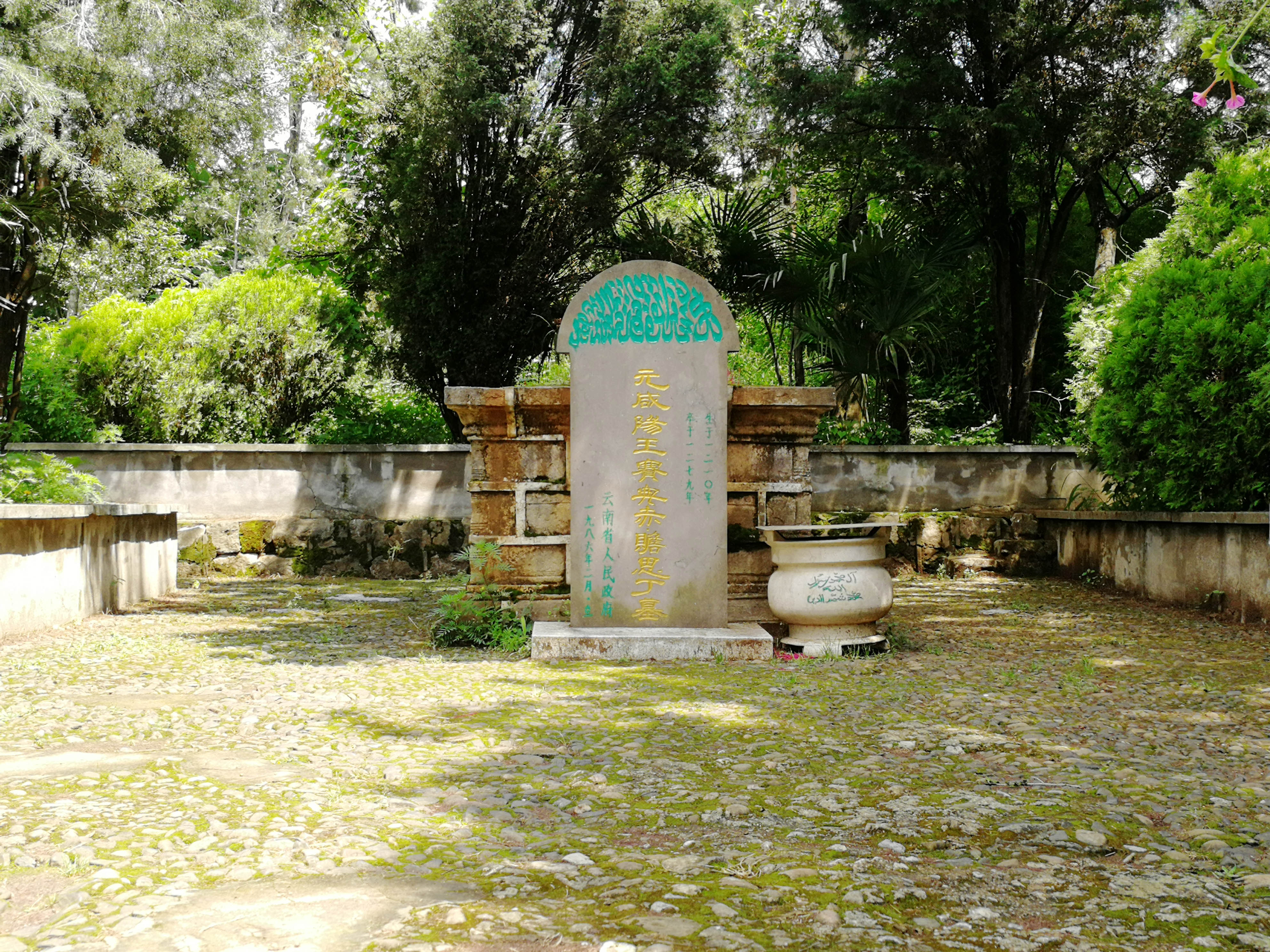
Tomb of Sayyid Ajall Shams al-Din Omar al-Bukhari ibn Sayyid Kamal ad-Din bin Sayyid Shams al-Din Omar al-Bukhari, Yunnan, China

Sayyid Ajall Shams al-Din Omar al-Bukhari (Persian: سید اجل شمس‌الدین عمر بخاری; Chinese: 賽典赤·贍思丁; pinyin: Sàidiǎnchì Shànsīdīng; 1211–21 August 1279), posthumous name Prince Zhonghui of Xianyang (咸陽忠惠王), was a Semu politician of the Yuan dynasty of China. Originally from Bukhara, he served as the Yuan dynasty's first provincial governor of Yunnan. The Ming dynasty admiral Zheng He was descended from him.

== Life ==
Reputedly descended from Ali ibn Abi Talib and Muhammad, Sayyid Shams al-Din Ajall's father was Kamāl al-Dīn and his grandfather was Shams al-Dīn 'Umar al-Bukhārī. He was of Central Asian Iranic origin, being a Muslim Khwarezmian from Bukhara (in present-day Uzbekistan). According to Marshall Broomhall, Shams al-Din, "who was a native of Bokhara, is said to have been a descendant of Mohammed (twenty-seventh generation)." When Genghis Khan attacked the city during the war between the Khwarizmi Shah and the Mongols, Sayyid Ajall Shams al-Din Omar's family surrendered to him. Sayyid participated in Mongke Khan's conquest of Sichuan and was in charge of logistics. He served the court of the Yuan dynasty at Yanjing (modern day Beijing). Later, he was in charge of Imperial finances in 1259, sent to Yunnan by Kublai Khan after conquering the Kingdom of Dali in 1274. After his death, Sayyid was given the posthumous name Zhongyi (忠懿). Later, the imperial court conferred the title "Prince of Xianyang" (咸陽王) and the posthumous name Zhonghui (忠惠) on him.

The Yuanshi gives many biographies of distinguished Muslims in the service of the Mongols. A number of them occupied high offices. In chap, cxxv, we find the biography of Ajall Shams ad-Din Omar (in Chinese: 赛典赤·赡思丁 Sai-dien-ch'i shan-sse-ding, called also 烏馬兒 Wu-ma-r). He was a Hui and descendant of the Prophet Muhammad (别菴伯爾 Bie-an-bo-r). In his country Sai-dien-ch'i has the same meaning as 貴族 (noble family) in Chinese. There is a long biography of Sai-dien-ch'i.

== Policy during Governorship ==
Sayyid Ajall founded a "Chinese style" city where modern Kunming is today, called Zhongjing Cheng. He ordered that a Buddhist temple, a Confucian temple, and two mosques be built in the city. Advocating Islam, Christianity, Buddhism, Daoism and Confucianism was part of the Mongolian religious policy. The Confucian temple that Sayyid Ajall built in 1274, which also doubled as a school, was the first Confucian temple ever to be built in Yunnan.

Both Confucianism and Islam were promoted by Sayyid Ajall in his "civilizing mission" during his time in Yunnan. Sayyid Ajall viewed Yunnan as "backward and barbarian" and utilized Confucianism, Islam, and Buddhism for "civilizing" the area.

In Yunnan, the presence of Islam is credited to Sayyid Ajall's work.

Sayyid Ajall was first to bring Islam to Yunnan. He promoted Confucianism and Islam by ordering construction of mosques and temples of Confucianism. Sayyid Ajall also introduced Confucian education into Yunnan. He was described as making "the orangutans and butcherbirds became unicorns and phonixes [sic] and their felts and furs were exchanged for gowns and caps", and praised by the Regional Superintendent of Confucian studies, He Hongzuo.

Shams al-Din constructed numerous Confucian temples in Yunnan, and promoted Confucian education. He is best known among the Chinese for helping sinicize Yunnan province. He also built multiple mosques in Yunnan as well.

Confucian rituals and traditions were introduced to Yunnan by Sayyid Ajall. Several Confucian temples and schools were founded by him. Chinese social structures, and Chinese style funeral and marriage customs were spread to the natives by Sayyid Ajall.

The aim of Sayyid Ajall's policy of promoting Confucianism and education in Yunnan was to "civilize" the native "barbarians". Confucian rituals were taught to students in newly founded schools by Sichuanese scholars, and Confucian temples were built. The natives of Yunnan were instructed in Confucian ceremonies like weddings, matchmaking, funerals, ancestor worship, and kowtow by Sayyid Ajall. The native leaders had their "barbarian" clothing replaced by clothing given to them by Sayyid Ajall.

Both Marco Polo and Rashid al-Din recorded that Yunnan was heavily populated by Muslims during the Yuan Dynasty, with Rashid naming a city with all Muslim inhabitants as the 'great city of Yachi'. It has been suggested that Yachi was Dali City (Ta-li). Dali had many Hui people.

His son Nasir al-Din became Governor of Yunnan in 1279 after Sayyid Ajall died.

The historian Jacqueline Armijo-Hussein has written on Sayyid Ajall's Confucianization and Sinicization policies, in her dissertation Sayyid 'Ajall Shams al-Din: A Muslim from Central Asia, serving the Mongols in China, and bringing 'civilization' to Yunnan, the paper The Origins of Confucian and Islamic Education in Southwest China: Yunnan in the Yuan Period, and The Sinicization and Confucianization in Chinese and Western Historiography of a Muslim from Bukhara Serving Under the Mongols in China. He repaired and built many mosques, such as the Daxuexi Mosque and great Mosque in Xi'an. The Daxuexi Alley Mosque in Xi'an has a stele erected in 1523, indicates to the reforms and construction of the mosque by him.

== Family ==
This Nasruddin was apparently an officer of whom Rashiduddin speaks, and whom he calls governor (or perhaps commander) in Karajang. He describes him as having succeeded in that command to his father the Sayad Ajil of Bokhara, one of the best of Kiiblai's chief Ministers. Nasr-uddin retained his position in Yun-nan till his death, which Rashid, writing about 1300, says occurred five or six years before. His son Bayan, who also bore the grandfather's title of Sayad Ajil, was Minister of Finance under Kiiblai's successor; and another son, Hala, is also mentioned as one of the governors of the province of Fu-chau. (See Cathay, pp. 265, 268, and D'OAsson, II. 507-508.) Nasr-uddin (Nasulaiing) is also frequently mentioned as employed on this frontier by the Chinese authorities whom Pauthier cites. [Na-su-la-ding [Nasr-uddin] was the eldest of the five sons of the Mohammedan Sai-dien-ch'i shan-sze-ding, Sayad Ajil, a native of Bokhara, who died in Yun-nan, where he had been, governor when Kublai, in the reign of Mangu, entered the country. Nasr-uddin "has a separate biography in ch. cxxv of the Yuenshi. He was governor of the province of Yunnan, and distinguished himself in the war against the southern tribes of Kiao-chi (Cochin-China) and Mien (Burma). He died in 1292, the father of twelve sons, the names of five of which are given in the biography, viz. Bo-yen-ch'a-rh [Bayan], who held a high office, Omar, Djafar, Hussein, and Saadi." (Brelschneider, Med. A'es. I. 270-271). Mr. E. H. Parker writes in the China Review, February–March, 1901, pp. 196-197, that the Mongol history states that amongst thereformsof Nasr-uddin's father in Yun-nan, was the introduction of coffins for the dead, instead of burning them.—H. C]

— The Book of Ser Marco Polo: The Venetian, Concerning the Kingdoms and Marvels of the East, Volume 2, Henri Cordier, p. 104

He submitted to Chinghiz when the latter waged war in western Asia, and entered his life-guard. Under Ogotai and Mangu khans he was governor, and held other offices. Kublai khan appointed him minister (see also the list of the ministers, in the Yuan shi, chap. cxii). He died in Yunnan, where he had been governor. Five sons of Sai-dien-ch'i are mentioned, viz. 納速剌丁 Na-su-la-ding (Nasr-uddin), 哈散 Hasan (Hassan), 忽辛 Hu-sin (Hussein), 苫速丁 兀默里 Shan-su-ding wu-mo-li(Shamsddin Omar) and 馬速忽 Ma-su-hu(Mas'ud). All these held high offices.

Na-su-la-ding has a separate biography in the same chapter. He was governor in Yunnan, and distinguished himself in the war with the southern tribes of 交趾 Kiao-chi (Cochin-china) and 緬 Mien (Burma). He died in 1292, the father of twelve sons the names of five of which are given in the biography, viz. 伯顏察兒 Bo-yen ch'a-r, who had a high office, 烏馬兒 Wu-ma-r, 答法兒 Dje-fa-r (Djafar), 忽先 Hu-sien (Hussein) and 沙的 Sha-di (Saadi).

The Sai-dien-ch'i of the Chinese authors is without doubt the same personage spoken of by Rashid (D'Ohsson, torn, ii, p. 467) under the name of Sayid Edjell. According to the Persian historian, he was a native of Bokhara, and governor of Karadjang (Yunnan) when Kubilai entered the country, under the reign of Mangu. Subsequently he was appointed vizier, and in the beginning of Kubilai's reign he had charge of the finances. His son Nasruddin was appointed governor in Karadjang, and retained his position in Yunnan till his death, which Rashid, writing about AD 1300, says occurred five or six years before (according to the Yüan shi, Na-su-la ding died in 1292). Nasr-uddin's son Abubeker, who had the surname Bayan Fenchan (evidently the Boyen ch'a-r of the Yüan shi), was governor in Zaitun at the time Rashid wrote. He bore also his grandfather's title of Sayid Edjell, and was minister of Finance under Kubilai's successor (D'Ohsson, torn, ii, pp. 476, 507, 508). Nasr-uddin is mentioned by M. Polo, who styles him Nescradin (vol. ii, p. 66).

— Notices of the Mediæval Geography and History of Central and Western Asia, E. Bretschneider, p. 48

Sayyid Ajall's oldest son was Nasir al-Din. Sayyid Ajall's seventh generation descendant was Sai Hazhi.

Sayyid Ajall was a 26th generation descendant of the Prophet Muhammad and fifth generation descendant of Su fei-erh. In total, he had five sons. He had two tombs, one in Wo-erh-to in Yunnan and another memorial which contained his clothes in Xi'an in Shaanxi province. The author of "The Magnetic Needle of Islam", Ma Chu (1630–1710), was a descendant of Sayyid Ajall. The d'Ollone expedition during the Qing dynasty recorded that Imam Na Wa-Ch'ing was the leader of the family of descendants of Sayyid Ajall. Ma repaired Sayyid Ajall's tomb. Another romanization of Ma Chu is "Ma Zhu". Sayyed Ajall's descendants included 15th generation- Ma Zhu and 25th generation- Ma Dexin.

Sayyid Ajall is the ancestor of many Muslims in areas all across China. Yunnan contained the greatest number of his descendants.

One of his most prominent descendants was Zheng He.

In the thirteenth century the influence of individual Muslims was immense, especially that of the Seyyid Edjell Shams ed-Din Omar, who served the Mongol Khans till his death in Yunnan AD 1279. His family still exists in Yunnan, and has taken a prominent part in Muslim affairs in China.

He is identified as the ancestor of many Chinese Hui lineages in Yunnan's Panthay Hui population as well as in Ningxia and Fujian provinces.

A Hui legend in Ningxia links four surnames common in the region - Na, Su, La, and Ding - with the descendants of Shams al-Din's son named Nasruddin, who "divided" their ancestor's name (Nasulading, in Chinese) among themselves. The Ding family of Chendai, Fujian claims descent from him. The Ding family has branches in Taiwan, the Philippines, and Malaysia among the diaspora Chinese communities there, no longer practicing Islam but still maintaining a Hui identity.

It was the Ming loyalist Confucian Hui Muslim scholar Ma Zhu (1640-1710) from Yunnan who traced many Hui lineage's ancestry back to Sayyid Ajall, constructing genealogies for them, specifically claiming that Hui who were not surnamed Ma were descended from Sayyid Ajjall, like Hui surnamed Na, Su, La, and Ding, while tracing his own ancestry and other Hui in Yunnan who were surnamed Ma to the Ming Muslim official Sai Haizhi.

The deputy secretary-general of the Chinese Muslim Association on Taiwan, Ishag Ma (馬孝棋), has claimed "Sayyid is an honorable title given to descendants of the Prophet Mohammed, hence Sayyid Shamsuddin must be connected to Mohammed". The Ding (Ting) family in Taisi Township in Yunlin County of Taiwan, traces descent from him through the Ding of Quanzhou in Fujian.

Su fei-erh is alleged by the Fa-hsiang to be the ancestor of Sayyid Ajall, however, some were skeptical of this claim and think it was a forgery to mask Sayyid Ajall's arrival to China with the Mongols. Chuan-Chao Wang of Fudan University studied the Y chromosomes of Sayyid Ajall's present descendants, and found they all have haplogroup L1a-M76, proving a southern Persian origin.

== See also ==
- History of Yunnan
- Hui people
- Iranians in China

== Footnotes ==
- This article incorporates text from The preaching of Islam: a history of the propagation of the Muslim faith, by Sir Thomas Walker Arnold, a publication from 1896, now in the public domain in the United States.
- This article incorporates text from The Chinese people: a handbook on China ..., by Arthur Evans Moule, a publication from 1914, now in the public domain in the United States.
- This article incorporates text from Journal of the North-China Branch of the Royal Asiatic Society, Volume 10, by Royal Asiatic Society of Great Britain and Ireland. North-China Branch, a publication from 1876, now in the public domain in the United States.
- This article incorporates text from Notices of the mediaeval geography and history of central and western Asia, by E. Bretschneider, a publication from 1876, now in the public domain in the United States.
- This article incorporates text from Journal of the North China Branch of the Royal Asiatic Society, Volume 10, by Royal Asiatic Society of Great Britain and Ireland. North China Branch, Shanghai, Royal Asiatic Society of Great Britain and Ireland. China Branch, Shanghai Literary and Scientific Society, a publication from 1876, now in the public domain in the United States.
