= Panthays =

Hui people in Myanmar

Panthay
ပန်းသေး

Regions with significant populations
- Myanmar • China

Religion
- Islam

Related ethnic groups
- Hui (Dungan), Chin Haw, Shan people, Tibetan Muslims

Panthays (Note: Burmese: ပန်းသေးလူမျိုး [páɴðé lùmjó]; Chinese: 潘泰人 Pāntàirén; Dungan: Пантэжын) are a Chinese Muslim ethnic group in Myanmar. They are one of the oldest groups of Muslims in Burma. The exact proportion of the Chinese Muslim group in the local Chinese population remains unknown due to a lack of data. However, they are concentrated particularly in the northern part of Myanmar, closer to Yunnan, China, from where the Panthays historically originated. They particularly reside in the towns of Tangyan, Maymyo, Mogok, and Taunggyi in Mandalay and Shan State.

== Etymology ==
The name Panthay is a Burmese word, which is said to be identical with the Shan word Pang hse. It was the name by which the Burmese refer to Chinese Muslims who came with caravans to Burma from the Chinese province of Yunnan. The name was not used or known in Yunnan itself. The predominant Muslim ethnic group living in Yunnan are the Hui (Chinese: 回族) and identify as Hui or Huihui (Chinese: 回回), but never as Panthay. Notably, the Panthay Rebellion in Yunnan during the mid 19th century is called in Chinese as either the Du Wenxiu Rebellion or the Pingnan Kingdom.

Several theories are suggested as to its derivation, but none are strong enough to refute the others. The Burmese of Old Burma called their own indigenous Muslims Pathi, a word deriving from Persian. It was applied to all Muslims other than the Chinese Muslims. The term "Panthay" being used for Yunnanese Muslims dates from about this time; it was widely used by British travelers and diplomats in the region from about 1875.

One other theory is that Panthay is shortened version of the Burmese phrase "Tarup Pase", meaning Chinese Muslim. This was then anglicised by Sladen in his 1868 expedition to Dengyue, Yunnan. The term Panthay achieved widespread usage during the period of British rule, and remains the name by which Myanmar's Chinese Muslim community has generally been distinguished in English language sources to this day.

== Culture ==
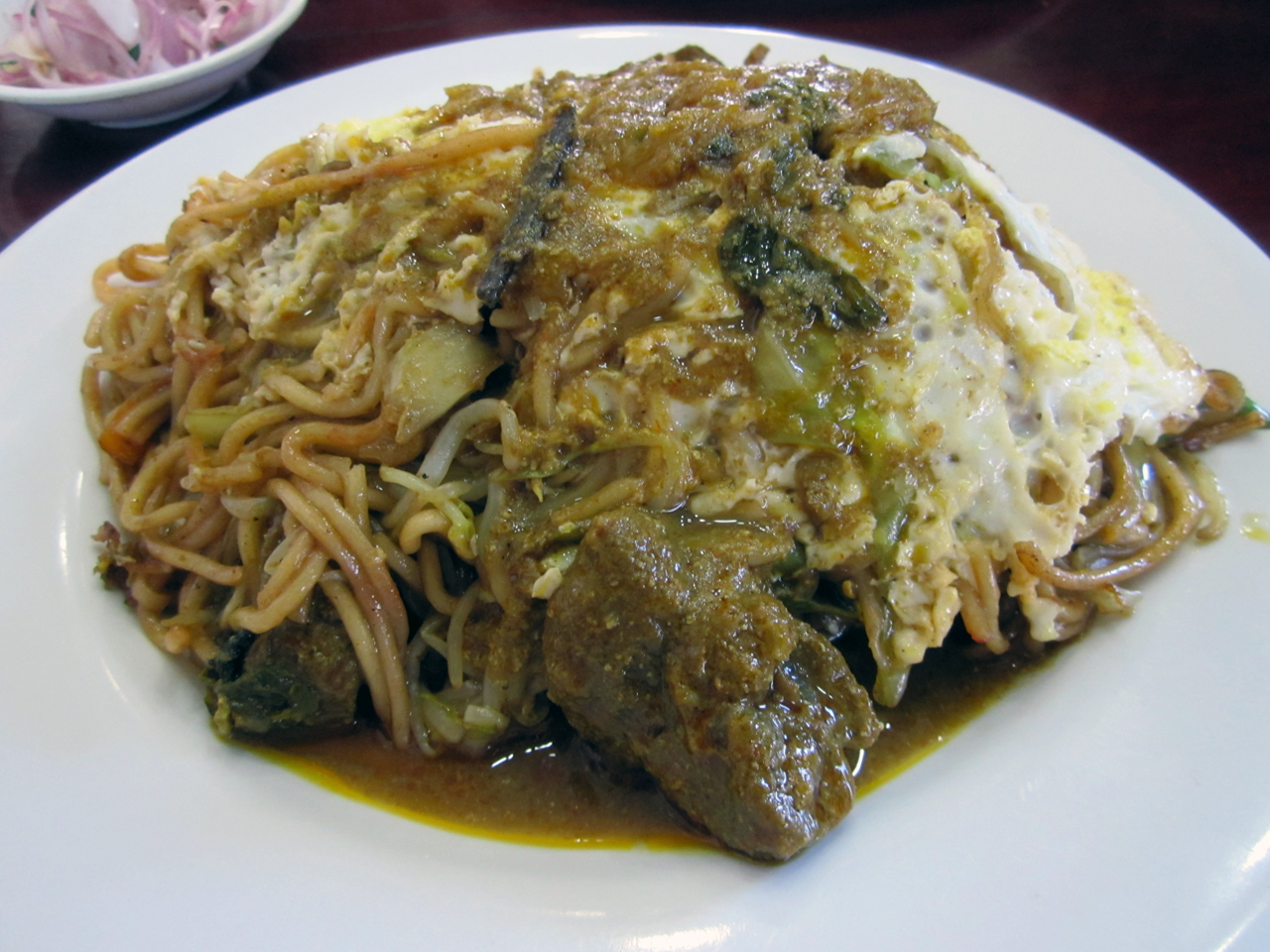
Panthay Khauk swè, a fried noodle dish in Myanmar

During the Panthay Rebellion, Sultan Suleiman (Du Wenxiu) was eager to establish close and friendly relations neighboring states. He took the opportunity to have a Chinese Muslim mosque installed at the Burmese King's capital. He sent Colonel Mah Too-tu, one of his senior military officers, as his special envoy and agent to Mandalay with the important mission. The mosque took about two years to finish and was opened in 1868 as the second mosque to be built in the royal capital. Today, 134 years later, the Panthay Mosque is still standing as the second oldest mosque in Mandalay.

No comprehensive census of the remaining Panthay population within Burma has been taken since 1931 as the 1941 census was cancelled. Restrictions on travel for foreigners, combined with the weak central government control over outlying areas of the Shan and Kachin Hills where many Panthays live, made attempts to calculate the Panthay population almost impossible in 1980. An estimate of 100,000 Panthays residing within Burma appeared in the Burmese daily Hanthawaddi in 1960.

Readily identifiable Panthay communities continue to exist in several areas like Yangon, Mandalay, Taunggyi. Ny report, the Panthays have communities in Kengtung, Bhamo, Mogok, Lashio, Pyin-Oo-Lwin and at Tanyan, near Lashio. Wherever they have settled in sufficient numbers, the Panthays have established their own mosques and madrasas. Some of these mosques are in "pseudo-Moghul" style, clearly having been influenced by Indian Muslim tastes and styles, whilst others (notably at Mandalay) have Chinese architectural features.

As with the Hui in China, the Burmese Panthay are exclusively Muslims adhering to the Hanafi school of thought. Few are conversant with more than the most elementary phrases of Arabic, and quite often when a Panthay imam is not available to care for the spiritual welfare of a community, a South Asian and Zerbadi Muslim is engaged instead. The Zerbadi are descendent community of intermarriages between foreign Muslim (South Asian and West Asian) males and Burmese females.

=== Panthay caravaners ===
In the pre-colonial times, the Panthays emerged as excellent long-distance caravaneers of southern China and northern Southeast Asia. They virtually dominated whole caravan trade of Yunnan by the time the first pioneers of French and British imperialism arrived in Yunnan. By the mid 19th century the caravans of Yunnanese traders ranged over an area extending from the eastern frontiers of Tibet, through Assam, Burma, Thailand, Laos and Tongkin (presently part of Vietnam), to the southern Chinese provinces of Sichuan, Guizhou and Guangxi. The Chinese Muslim domination of the Yunnan caravan network continued well into the 20th century.

The Chinese Muslims of Yunnan were noted for their mercantile prowess. Within Yunnan, the Muslim population excelled as merchants and soldiers, the two qualities, which made them ideally suited to the rigors of overland trade in the rugged, mountainous regions, and to deserve the rewards therefrom. They might have been helped in this by their religion of Islam from its inception had flourished as a Religion of Trade. The religious requirement to perform Hajj pilgrimage had also helped them to establish an overland road between Yunnan and Arabia as early as the first half of the 14th century.

The merchandise brought from Yunnan by the Panthay caravaneers included silk, tea, metal utensils, iron in the rough, felts, finished articles of clothing, walnuts, opium, wax, preserved fruits and foods, and dried meat of several kinds. The Burmese goods taken back to Yunnan were raw cotton, raw and wrought silk, amber, jades and other precious stones, velvets, betel-nuts, tobacco, gold-leaf, preserves, paper, dye woods, stick lac, ivory, and specialized foodstuffs such as slugs, edible bird's nest, among other things. Raw cotton, which was reserved as a royal monopoly, was in great demand in China. An extensive trade in this commodity had existed between the Konbaung dynasty and Yunnan. Goods were transported up the Ayeyarwady River to Bhamo, where it was sold to the Chinese merchants, and conveyed partly by land and partly by water into Yunnan, and from there to other provinces of China. Most caravans consisted of between fifty and one hundred mules, employing ten to fifteen drivers.

== History ==
=== Muslims in Yunnan ===
The history of the Panthays in Burma was inseparably linked to that of Yunnan, their place of origin. Within Yunnan, the Chinese Muslim population excelled as merchants and soldiers, which made them ideally suited to the rigors of overland trade in the mountainous regions. Commercial and cultural contacts between the Yunnan–Guizhou Plateau and the Irrawaddy Delta and lower Salween River probably predate significant migration by Han Chinese or Bamar populations into either area.

In the 8th century, the Yi state of Nanzhao was the dominant power in the region, a position which both it and its successor, the Dali Kingdom, held until the Mongol conquest of the region five centuries later. Despite the political independence of Nanzhao, Chinese cultural influence penetrated the frontier region throughout the Tang and Song dynasties. It is possible that during the mid-Tang period – in about 801 – surrendered Muslim soldiers, described in the Chinese Annals as the Hēiyī Dàshí (Chinese: 黑依大使; pinyin: Hēiyī Dàshí, "Black-clad Tay'ī, a term referring to the black flags of the Abbasid Caliphate) were first settled in Yunnan.

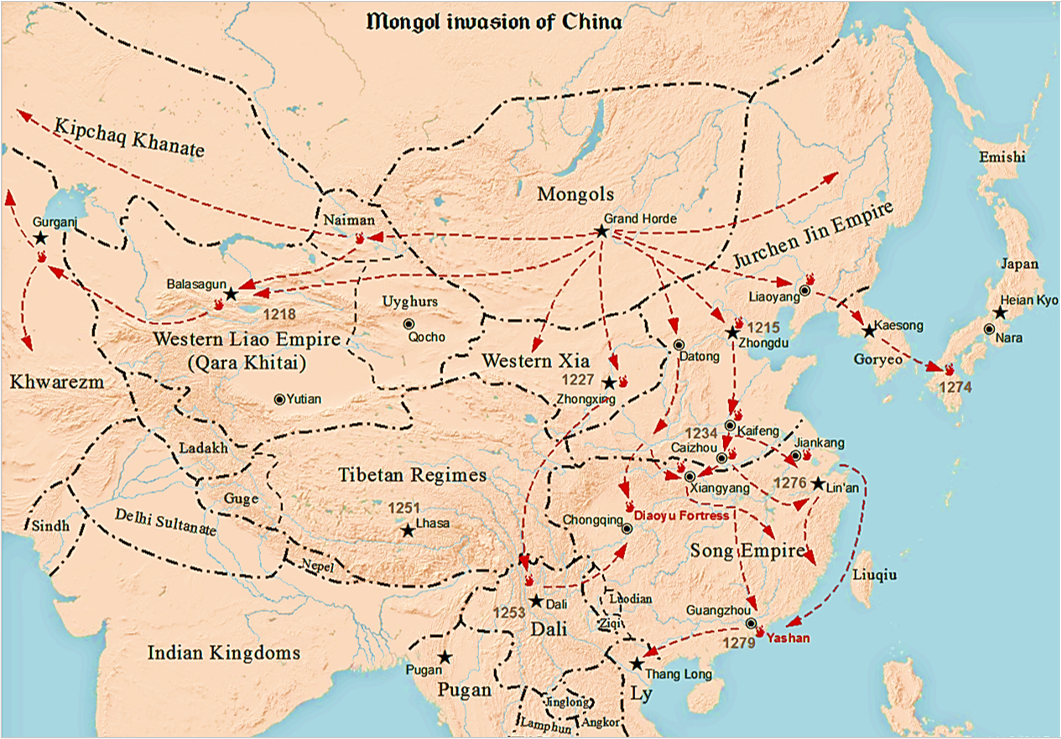
Mongol Invasion of China

It is at least certain that Muslims of Central Asian origin played a major role in the Yuan conquest and rule of Southwest China. As a result, a distinct Muslim community was established in Yunnan by the late 13th century. One important soldier-administrator was Sayyid Ajjal Shams al-Din Omar, a Turkic court official and general who became Yuan Governor of Yunnan from 1274–79. His son Nasir al-Din, was in charge of Yunnan's road systems and commanded the first Mongol invasion of Burma in 1277. Shams al-Din is represented as a wise and benevolent ruler, who successfully "pacified and comforted" the people of Yunnan, and who is credited with building temples of Confucius as well as mosques and schools. During his rule, a significant number of Muslim soldiers of Central Asian origin were transferred to Yunnan, which was still largely unpopulated by Han Chinese settlers. The descendants of these Muslim garrison troops are the nucleus of present-day Chinese Muslim populations both in Yunnan and Burma.

Within Yunnan, the Hui Muslim population flourished throughout the Yuan and Ming periods. In the early Yuan dynasty, Marco Polo noted the presence of "Saracens" amongst the population during his visit. The Persian historian Rashid-al-Din Hamadani similarly recorded in the Jami' al-tawarikh that "the great city of Yachi" in Yunnan was exclusively inhabited by Muslims. Rashid al-Din may have been referring to the region around Dali, which was the earliest centre of Hui settlement in Yunnan.

=== Panthays during Konbaung period ===
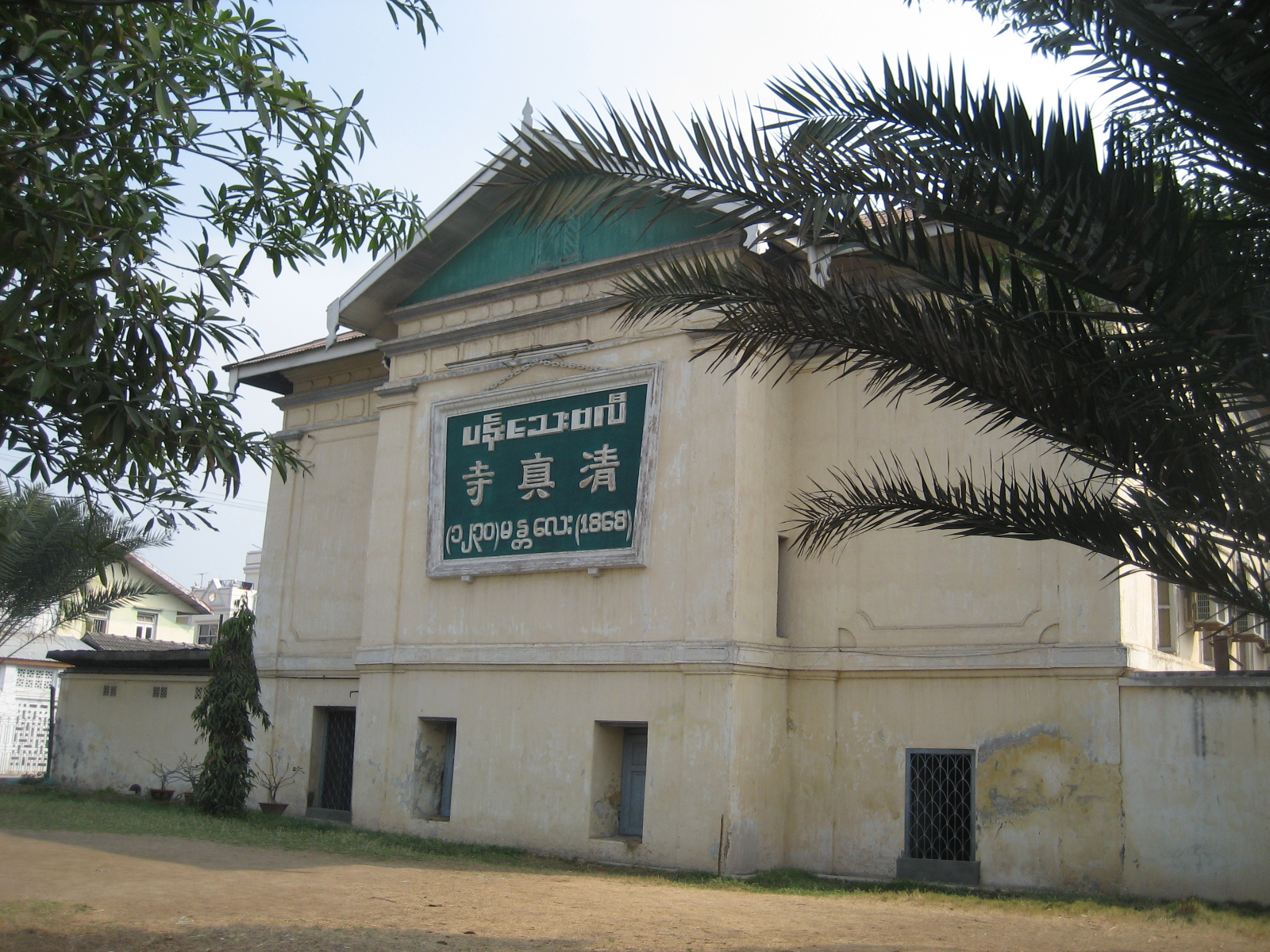
Panthay Mosque (清真寺; Qīngzhēn Sì) in Mandalay

In the 19th century, during the Konbaung period, Panthays started to settle in the royal capital of Mandalay, particularly during the reign of King Mindon. Although their number was small, a few found their way inside the court as jade-assessors. They lived side by side with non-Muslim Chinese in Chinatowns (Burmese: တရုတ်တန်း;tayoke tan), which had been designated by King Mindon as the residential area for the Chinese. The non-Muslim Chinese had started settling in considerably earlier. So by the arrival of the Panthays, there already was a Chinese community at Mandalay with its own bank, companies and warehouses and organized social and economic life.

It happened that there were also already Chinese jade assessors in the employ of the king. Rivalry between the Chinese and Panthay jade-assessors in courting the royal favor naturally led to a quarrel between the two groups, resulting in a number of deaths. King Mindon did not give much serious thought to the religious and social differences between the Panthays and the Chinese. But after the Chinatown quarrel, the king began to see the wisdom of separating the two groups.

King Mindon granted the Panthays of the royal capital land on which to settle as a separate community. The goal is to prevent further quarrels between them and the Chinese. The Panthays were given the rare favor of choosing their own place of residence within the confines of the royal capital, and they chose the site on which the present-day Panthay Compound is located. It was bounded on the north by 35th Street, in the south by 36th Street, in the east by 79th Street and in the west by 80th Street. This site was chosen because it was the camping ground for the mule caravans from Yunnan, which regularly came to the capital via the Hsenwi route.

The King also permitted a mosque to be built on the granted site so that the Panthays would have their own place of worship. Having no funds for an undertaking of such magnitude, the Panthays of Mandalay put up the matter to the Sultan of Yunnan. Sultan Sulaiman had already started a business enterprise (hao) in Mandalay and was happy to take the opportunity.

=== Panthay rebellion ===
Seal of Du Wenxiu of the Pingnan Kingdom (1864–1873)

According to Ming Guangshi's book Panthay History, the Panthay originate from the families of some loyal lieutenants of the self-proclaimed Sultan of Yunnan - the Hui General Du Wenxiu (Chinese: 杜文秀). These families fled to Wa State in northern Shan State after the failure of the Panthay Rebellion under the leadership of Ma Lin-Gi (Chinese: 馬靈驥). Ma Lin-Gi divorced his wife of surname Yuan and married a widow of surname Ting. They later had two sons, the elder named Mah Mei-Ting (馬美廷) born in 1878 and the second son named Mah Shen-Ting (馬陞廷) born in 1879. The older son later became the leader of the Panthay community in Myanmar.

During the early 19th century, the Hui Muslim and other minority peoples of Yunnan faced increased population pressures as a result of Han Chinese migration to the province. Resentment against this development, coupled with mounting hostility towards Qing rule, led to the Panthay Rebellion in 1855. Muslim miners in the Jianshui region were the starting point of the rebellion. Within two years, the center of rebellion had spread to westwards under the leadership of Du Wenxiu. Du was a Hui born in Yongcheng. Du Wenxiu's father was a Han who converted to Islam.

The unfavorable discrimination with which the Hui were treated was at the root of their rebellions. However, the revolt was not religious in nature, since the Muslims were joined by non-Muslim Shan and Kakhyen groups. In addition, loyalist Muslim forces helped Qing crush the rebel Muslims.

For the next fifteen years, until the Qing reconquest, Dali remained the capital of the self-proclaimed Pingnan Kingdom, "Country of the peaceful South", proclaimed as an "Islamic Kingdom of Yunnan". Du erected a Forbidden City, wore Ming hanfu in repudiation of Qing authority, and adopted the Muslim name and title "Sultan Sulayman". The Sultanate, fashioned after those in the Middle East, survived in Yunnan for over ten years, reaching its heights in 1860. Panthay governorships were also created in a few important cities, such as Momein (Tengchong), close to the Burmese border town of Bhamo.

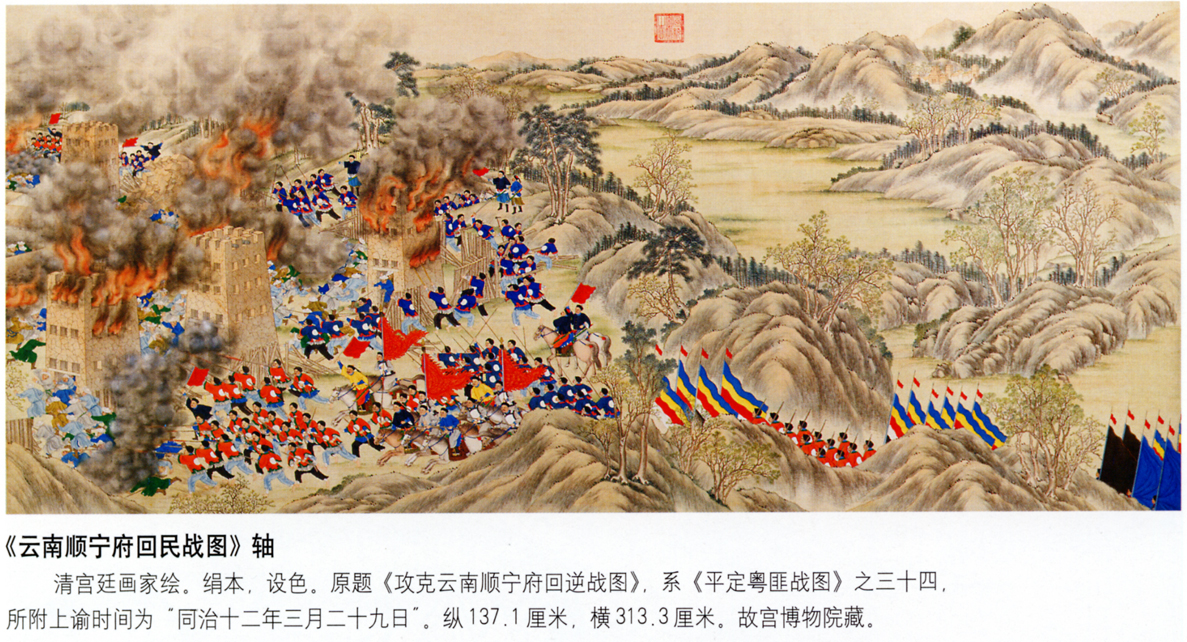
Capture of Shunning during the Panthay Rebellion

The Qing secretly hounded mobs onto the rich Panthays, provoked anti-Hui riots and instigated the destruction of their mosques. The Panthays repulsed the desultory attacks and took town after town. The ancient holy city of Dali fell to the Panthays in 1857. With the capture of Dali, Muslim supremacy became an established fact in Yunnan.

During this period, the Sultan Suleiman, on his way to Mecca as a pilgrim, visited Rangoon, presumably via the Kengtung. From there he went to Calcutta where he had a chance to see the power of the British colonists. He had also started a company in Mandalay, housed in a one-story brick building located at the present-day Taryedan on the west side of the 80th Street, between 36th and 37th Streets. The hao had been carrying on business in precious stones, jades, cotton, silk and other commodities of both Chinese and Burmese origins.

The Panthay power declined after 1868. The Chinese Imperial Government had succeeded in reinvigorating itself. By 1871, it launched a campaign for the annihilation of the Panthays. Quickly, towns fell and Sultan Suleiman found himself caged in by the walls of his capital. He turned to the British colonists for military assistance, but was unsuccessful. Seeing no escape, Sultan Suleiman tried to take his own life before the fall of Dali, but was beheaded before the poison could take effect. The Sultan's head was preserved in honey and sent to the Imperial Court as a trophy of their decisive victory.

=== Exodus ===
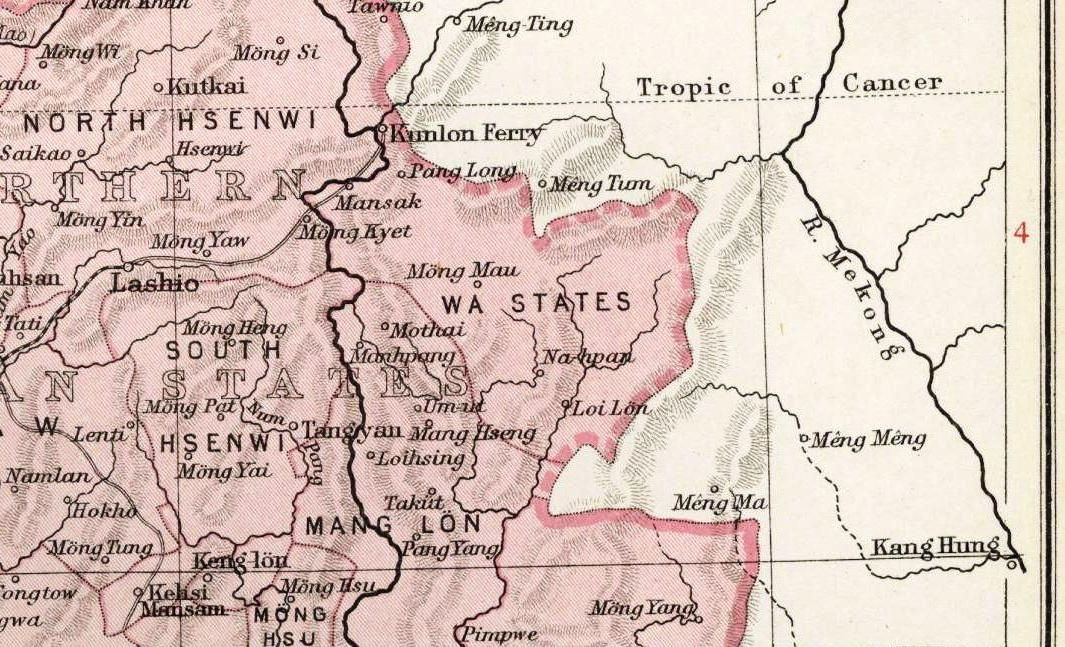
Panglong in an early 20th century Imperial Gazetteer of India map section

The scattered remnants of the Panthay troops continue their resistance after the fall of Dali. But when Momien was next besieged and stormed by the imperial troops in May 1873, their resistance broke completely. Many adherents to the Panthay cause were persecuted by the Qing. Many Panthays fled with their families across the Burmese border and took refuge in the Wa State where, they set up the exclusively Panthay town of Panglong in 1875.

The demise of the Sultanate had shattered the hope of all their own Islamic kingdom in Yunnan. For a period of perhaps ten to fifteen years following the collapse, the province's Hui minority was widely discriminated against. During these years, Hui refugees settled across the frontier within Burma and gradually established themselves in their traditional callings – as merchants, caravaneers, miners, restaurateurs as well as some smugglers and mercenaries. 15 years after the fall of the Sultanate, the original Panthay settlements had grown to include numbers of Shan and other hill peoples.

==== Mandalay ====
Colonel Mah Too-tu found himself in the same situation. When the Sultanate fell, Mah Too-tu was stranded at Mandalay. For a man of his rank and stature, going back to Dali meant sure execution by the Qing authorities. In November 1868, he bought a plot of land with a house on it for 80 pieces of one-kyat coins from Khunit Ywa-sa Princess. On 7 June 1873, Mah Too-tu married Shwe Gwe, a lady from Sagyin-wa village near Amarapura, who happened to be the daughter of a princess of Manipur brought to Mandalay as a captive by the Burmese king. Mah Too-tu spent the last years of his life at the Panthay Compound with his Burmese wife.

After the mass exodus from Yunnan, the number of Panthays residing in Mandalay gradually increased. The new arrivals, usually families, came by way of Bhamo or via the Wa State. When the land for the Panthays was granted by King Mindon, there were a few houses on it, in addition to several old graves. The place had been an abandoned graveyard. In the years immediately following the completion of the mosque, there were fewer than twenty houses in the Panthay Compound. There were also between ten and twenty Panthay households living in other parts of Mandalay.

The establishment of the Panthay Mosque in 1868 marked the emergence of the Panthays as a distinct community in Mandalay. Although the number of this first generation of Panthays remained small, the mosque signified the beginning of the first Panthay Jama'at (Congregation) in Mandalay Ratanabon Naypyidaw.

==== Panlong ====
Over the next thirty years or so, the Panthays of Panlong in Wa State continued to prosper. By the early 1920s, a feud had developed between them and the Wa in neighbouring Pangkham. In 1926, this erupted into the local "Wa-Panthay War". The Panthay emerged victorious and Panlong threw off its vassalage to Pangkham and reinforced its dominance over trade in the area.

In addition to legitimate trading, the Panthays of Panlong also became known as 'the aristocrats of the opium business' in the region now known as the Golden Triangle. The Panthay left the risky business of peddling this highly profitable commodity locally to Shan and Han Chinese dealers. Instead, they ran large, well-armed caravans in long-distance convoys far into Siam, Laos, Tonkin and Yunnan. Each muleload was guarded by two rifles.

When Harvey visited Panlong in 1931, he found that Panthay numbers had risen to 5,000 ('including local recruits') and that they were financed by Singaporean Chinese, had 130 Mauser rifles with 1,500 mules, and exported opium by the hundredweight into French, Siamese and British territory. In contrast to Harvey's estimate, official estimates put the Panthay population of Burma at 2,202 for 1911 (1,427 males and 775 females), whilst by the 1921 Census of India, this had declined to 1,517 (1,076 males and 441 females), and by 1931 to 1,106 (685 males and 421 females).

=== British Burma ===
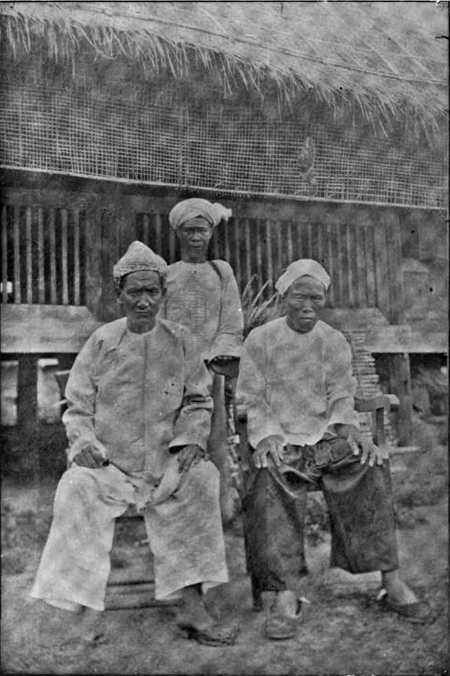
Panthay men in British Burma.

Other Panthays moved further into Burma, initially as miners anxious to exploit the ruby mines of Mogok; the Baldwin silver mines of Namtu in the Northern Shan State, the jade mines of Mogaung in Kachin State. Numbers of Panthay restaurateurs and innkeepers, merchants and traders settled in the urban centres of upland Burma – chiefly at Lashio, Kengtung, Bhamo and Taunggyi – to service the needs of these miners, passing caravaneers and local inhabitants. Other settlements largely devoted to trade with the indigenous Shan and Karen populations sprang up along the Salween River. Some moved to major urban centres of the Burmese lowlands, most notably to Mandalay and Rangoon, where they flourished as merchants and middlemen representatives of Panlong and the other "Overland Chinese" settlements of Upper Burma and the "Overseas Chinese" community of the lowland port-cities. Bassein and Moulmein must also have attracted some Panthay settlement, the latter port being a terminus of the overland caravan trade from Yunnan in its own right, via the northern Thai trade route through Kengtung, Chiang Mai and Mae Sariang.

During most of the British rule in Burma, these Panthay settlers flourished, specialising in all levels of commerce from the international gem markets to shop and inn-keeping, mule-breeding and peddling or street hawking. Yunnanese peddlers penetrated into the unadministered and inaccessible hill tracts of "The Triangle" between the Mali Hka and Nmai Hka rivers, to the north of Myitkyina. Beyond the urban centres of the Burmese lowlands, the Panthays continued their involvement in the caravan trade with Yunnan, transporting silk, tea, metal goods and foods from China to Burma, and carrying back European manufactured goods like broadcloths, specialized food and, above all, raw cotton, to Yunnan.

=== World War II and independence ===
The traditional dominance of Panthay in the trade of the Burma-Yunnan frontier region was set back by the construction of the Burma Road between Lashio and Kunming in 1937–38.

During World War II, the main Panthay settlement at Panglong was destroyed in 1941 by the Japanese invasion of Burma. Many Panthay fled to Yunnan, or crossed the jungle frontiers into Thailand and Laos to escape Japanese persecution. The Japanese destroyed Panglong, burning it and driving out the over 200 Hui households out as refugees to Yunnan and Kokang.

Ma Guanggui, a Hui, became the leader of the Hui Panlong self defense guard. The guard was created by the Kuomintang government of the Republic of China to fight against the Japanese invasion of Panlong in 1942. An account of the Japanese attack in Panlong was written and published in 1998 in the "Panglong Booklet".

The exodus of thousands of Yunnanese refugees and Kuomintang troops following the seizure of power by the Chinese Communists in 1949. As a result of these developments, which brought a flood of predominantly Han, and not Hui, "Overland Chinese" to the Burmese Shan States, many Panthay seem to have chosen to migrate to northern Thailand, where their communities continue to flourish.

== See also ==
- Burmese Chinese
- Burmese Malays
- Chin Haw
- Dungan people
- Hui people
- Islam in Burma
- Panthay Rebellion
- Tibetan Muslims
- Dai Muslims
