= Nasr al-Din (Yunnan) =

Provincial governor of Yunnan

Governor of Yunnan (Karadjang)
- In office 1279–1292
- Preceded by: Ajall Shams al-Din Omar
- Succeeded by: Husayn (Hussein or Hussain)

Personal details
- Born: Bukhara, Khwarazmian Empire
- Died: 1292 Yunnan, Yuan China
- Children: twelve sons in total, the names of five of which are given in his biography, viz. 伯顏察兒 Bo-yen ch'a-r, 烏馬兒 Wu-ma-r, 答法兒 Dje-fa-r (Djafar), 忽辛 Hu-xin (Hussein) and 沙的 Sha-di (Saadi)

Military service
- Allegiance: Yuan dynasty
- Battles/wars: Mongol invasion of Burma, Mongol invasions of Vietnam

Nasr al-Din (Persian: نصرالدین; Chinese: 納速剌丁; pinyin: Nàsùládīng; died 1292) was an official of China's Yuan dynasty, serving as the provincial governor of Yunnan. He was the eldest son of Ajall Shams al-Din Omar. He was posthumously accorded the noble title of Prince of Yan'an (延安王).

== Life ==
Nasr al-Din was of Central Asian origin, being a Muslim Khwarezmian from Bukhara. His father was the prominent leader Sayyid Ajjal Shams al-Din Omar. When Genghis Khan attacked the city during the war between the Khwarizmi shah and the Mongols, Sayyid Ajjal Shams al-Din Omar's family surrendered to him. Sayyid Ajjal served the court of the Mongol Empire. Later, Sayyid Ajjal was in charge of Imperial finances in 1259, sent to Yunnan by Kublai Khan after conquering the Kingdom of Dali in 1274.

In the thirteenth century the influence of individual Muslims was immense, especially that of the Seyyid Edjell Shams ed-Din Omar, who served the Mongol Khans till his death in Yunnan AD 1279. His family still exists in Yunnan, and has taken a prominent part in Muslim affairs in China.

Nasr al-Din is identified as the ancestor of many Chinese Hui lineages in Yunnan's Panthay Hui population as well as in Ningxia and Fujian provinces.

Marco Polo claimed that Nasr al-Din was a commander in the 1277 Mongol invasion of Burma and defeated the Burmese in the war. Marco Polo recorded his name as "Nescradin".

The widespread presence of Islam in Yunnan is due to Nasir Al-Din and his father Sayyid Ajall.

Nasr became Yunnan's governor after his father, the first governor of Yunnan, died. served in his office from 1279 to 1284. He was sent to participate in the 1284 Mongol invasion of Burma, which caused his term as governor to end.

Nasr also battled the native "Gold Teeth" people in Yunnan, and the Vietnamese during the Mongol invasion of Annam. Marco Polo had been wrong in claiming that Nasr had participated in the 1277 attack on Burma, Nasr fought in the 1284 invasion in reality. He was transferred to Shaanxi and appointed as its governor. Nasr al-Din's son Omar 烏馬兒 (Wu-ma-r) participated alongside him in the invasion of Annam (Vietnam).

His service as Governor there ended in his death in 1292, when he was charged with corruption and executed (Husayn, a brother of his, then became the next governor of Yunnan).

== Family ==
Nasr al-Din's father was the Governor of Yunnan, Sayyid Ajjal Shams al-Din Omar, whose Chinese name was Sai-dien-ch'i. Nasr al-Din's name in Chinese was "Na-su-la-ding".

Five sons of Sai-dien-ch'i are mentioned, viz. 納速剌丁 Na-su-la-ding (Nasr-uddin), 哈散 Hasan (Hassan), 忽辛 Hu-sin (Hussein), 剌丁 兀默里 Shan-su-ding wu-mo-li and 馬速忽 Ma-su-hu. All these held high offices.

Na-su-la-ding has a separate biography in the same chapter. He was governor in Yunnan, and distinguished himself in the war with the southern tribes of 交趾 Kiao-chi (Cochin-china) and 緬 Mien (Burma). He died in 1292, the father of twelve sons^ the names of five of which are given in the biography, viz. 伯顏察兒 Bo-yen ch'a-r, who had a high office, 烏馬兒 Wu-ma-r, 答法兒 Dje-fa-r (Djafar), 忽先 Hu-sien (Hussein) and 沙的 Sha-di (Saadi).

The Sai-dien-ch'i of the Chinese authors is without doubt the same personage spoken of by Rashid (D'Ohsson, torn, ii, p. 467) under the name of Sayid Edjell. According to the Persian historian, he was a native of Bokhara, and governor of Karadjang (Yunnan) when Kubilai entered the country, under the reign of Mangu. Subsequently, he was appointed vizier, and in the beginning of Kubilai's reign he had charge of the finances. His son Nasruddin was appointed governor in Karadjang, and retained his position in Yunnan till his death, which Rashid, writing about A. D. 1300, says occurred five or six years before (according to the Yüan shi, Na-su-la ding died in 1292). Nasr-uddin's son Abubeker, who had the surname Bayan Fenchan (evidently the Boyen ch'a-r of the Yüan shi), was governor in Zaitun at the time Bashid wrote. He bore also his grandfather's title of Sayid Edjell, and was minister of Finance under Kubilai's successor (D'Ohsson, torn, ii, pp. 476, 507, 508). Nasr-uddin is mentioned by M. Polo, who styles him Nescradin (vol. ii, p. 66).

A Hui legend in Ningxia links four surnames common in the region - Na, Su, La, and Ding - with Nasr al-Din (Nasruddin), who "divided" their ancestor's name (Nasulading, in Chinese) among themselves. The Ding family of Chendai, Fujian claims descent from him. The Ding family has branches in Taiwan, the Philippines, and Malaysia among the diaspora Chinese communities there, no longer practicing Islam but still maintaining a Hui identity. Na Zhong, a descendant of Nasr al-Din, was one of the students sent to Al-Azhar in 1931, along with Zhang Ziren, Ma Jian, and Lin Zhongming.

Besides the Han majority, the Muslim Hui also widely employed generation names, which they call lunzi paibie; for instance, in the Na family, the five most recent generations used the characters Wan, Yu, Zhang, Dian, and Hong. This practice is slowly fading since the government began keeping public records of genealogy.

== Footnotes ==
- This article incorporates text from The preaching of Islam: a history of the propagation of the Muslim faith, by Sir Thomas Walker Arnold, a publication from 1896, now in the public domain in the United States.
- This article incorporates text from The Chinese people: a handbook on China ..., by Arthur Evans Moule, a publication from 1914, now in the public domain in the United States.
- This article incorporates text from Journal of the North-China Branch of the Royal Asiatic Society, Volume 10, by Royal Asiatic Society of Great Britain and Ireland. North-China Branch, a publication from 1876, now in the public domain in the United States.
- This article incorporates text from Notices of the mediaeval geography and history of central and western Asia, by E. Bretschneider, a publication from 1876, now in the public domain in the United States.
- This article incorporates text from Journal of the North China Branch of the Royal Asiatic Society, Volume 10, by Royal Asiatic Society of Great Britain and Ireland. North China Branch, Shanghai, Royal Asiatic Society of Great Britain and Ireland. China Branch, Shanghai Literary and Scientific Society, a publication from 1876, now in the public domain in the United States.
