= Wang Jurong =

Chinese martial artist (1928-2006)

- Born: 1928; China
- Died: 2006 (aged 77–78); Texas, U.S.
- Style: Qigong, Tai chi, Bajiquan, Tan Tui, Chaquan, Huaquan, Pao Chuan, founder of Flying Rainbow Fan

Wang Jurong (Xiao'erjing: وْا ﮐُﻮْ -ژْﻮ, 1928–2006) was a Chinese-Muslim martial artist and Wushu professor in the Shanghai Institute of Physical Education.

A longtime promoter of Wushu, a teacher, an organizational officer, and a Wushu event-announcer, she was the first woman who was a certified judge of national ranking for both Wushu and Archery. Wang was also the founder of the Flying Rainbow Fan art.

== Family life ==
Wang Jurong was the daughter of Wang Ziping, a renowned figure in Chinese Martial Arts and Traditional Medicine. In 1955 Wang married Wu Chengde, who was a student of her father, a doctor and a professor of Traditional Chinese Medicine. She had three daughters Helen Wu (Xiaorong), Grace Wu (Xiaogo) and Wu Xiaoping.

== Education ==
Wang began her Wushu training at age five studying with her father. She learned Tan Tui, Chaquan, Huaquan, Bajiquan, Pao Chuan and Tai chi. As a child Wang would train six hours a day, including training Pai Dai (body striking) with her mostly male classmates. Though it was a peculiar request, her father also allowed her to learn the Kwan Do (heavy broadsword) as her first weapon. In 1952 Wang graduated from Aurora University in Shanghai.

=== Professorship and research ===
Wang Jurong became a founding professor of the East China Physical Education College (Shanghai Physical Education College). Teaching there for 36 years and conducting research in the field of Chinese martial arts, including Shaolin, Wudangquan, Tai chi, Tongbeiquan and Nanquan. She was interested in not only their techniques but also their theory.

The first graduate program was also developed at the college by her and she was the first professor to have two students earn a 'Masters of Martial Arts' degree in Tai chi.

== Accomplishments ==
Wang is a wushu champion athlete and coach, her professional accomplishments include:

- Women's Championship at the 7th National Athletic Games (1946)
- Gold Medal for Chaquan routine
- Women's Championship at the National Wushu Competition (1953)
- Gold Medal for Green Dragon Sword Technique
- First female coach of New China Wushu Team with Wang Zi-ping (1960)
- Director of the Chinese Martial Arts Association and Archery Association
- Vice-Chairman of the Shanghai Wushu Association, head of the Judging Committee
- Vice-Chairman of theShanghai Archery Association
- President of the Chinese Martial Arts Research Institute
- Advisor to the Wu Dang Research Association
- Advisor Shanghai Qi Gong Research Association
- Advisor United States Kungfu Federation
- Advisor US Kuoshu Federation
- Honorary Advisor Chinese Wushu History Association
- Women of the Year Inside Kung-fu Magazine (1995)
- Lifetime Achievement Award from the United States Wushu Kungfu Federation (1997)

== Flying Rainbow Fan ==
The Flying Rainbow Fan form was developed by Wang Jurong. The seven series of this form combine the styles of Tai chi, Bagua and Kung fu.

Wang Jurong describes the Flying Rainbow Fan in her own words:

I included the following elements: unification of stillness and motion, the mutual coordination of yi and qi, the harmony of the six internal and external components, strength building movements, practical applications, and artistic expression. These elements allow men, women and children of all ages to be able to grasp, and attain a strong healthy body. Through the combined internal and external training, one can achieve the goal of eliminating illness and extending years.

Flying Rainbow Fan is a current form in Wushu practice and in competition. It is taught by Wang Jurong's daughters Grace Wu and Helen Wu.
