= Hui people =

Chinese-speaking ethnoreligious group

回族
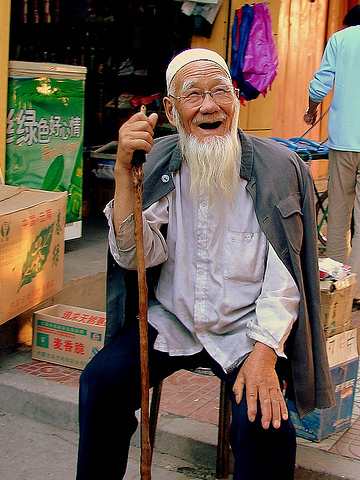
- Elderly Hui man in front of a shop

Total population
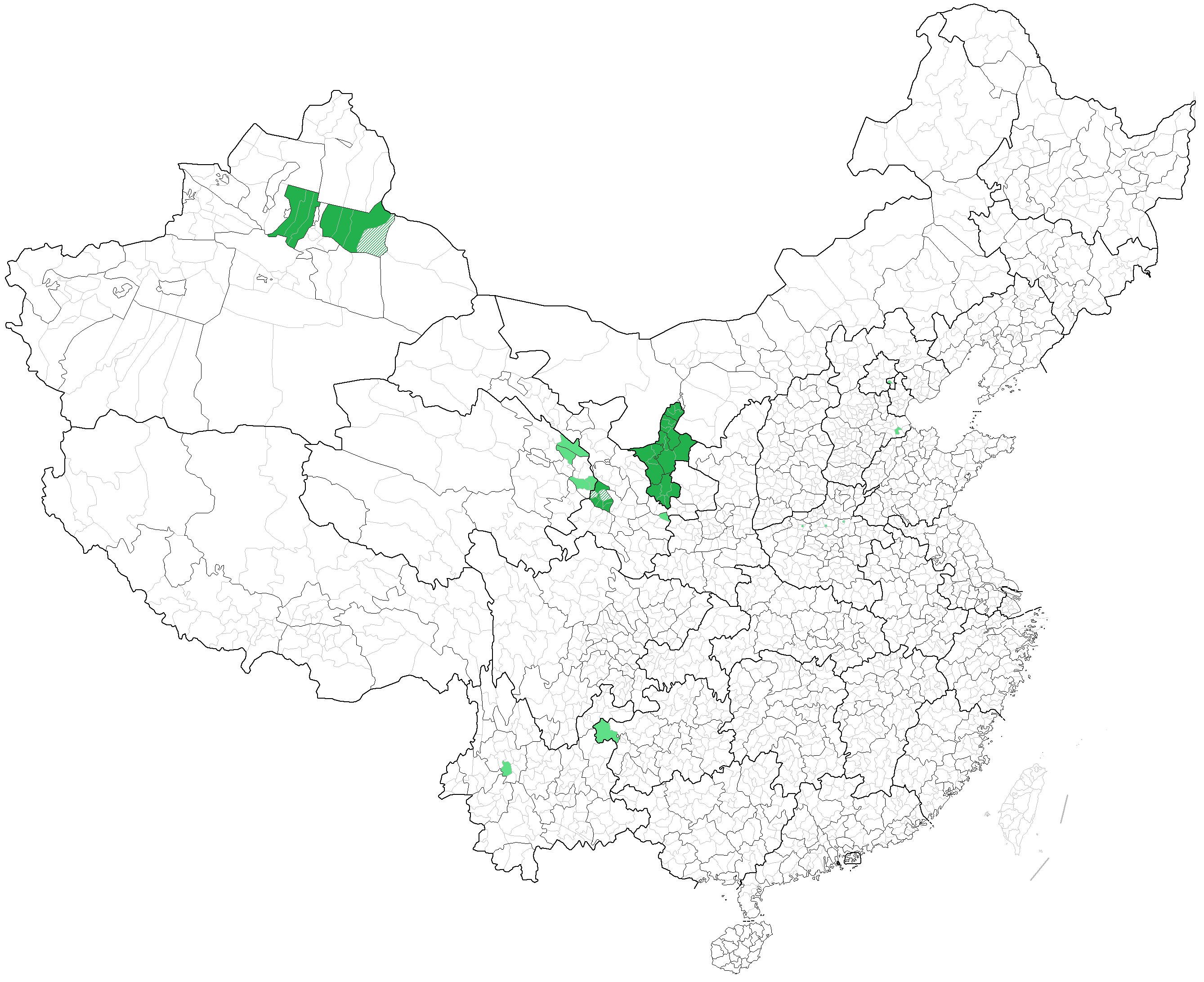
- 11,377,914 (2020) Distribution of Hui autonomous prefectures and counties in Mainland China

Regions with significant populations
- China (mainland): 11,377,914 (2020 census)
- Kazakhstan: 78 817 (2021)
- Kyrgyzstan: 76,573 (2021)
- Thailand: ~3,247 (2000)
- Russia: 3,028 (2021)
- Malaysia: 2,000 (2016)

Languages
- Predominantly Mandarin Chinese and other varieties of Chinese

Religion
- Predominantly Sunni Islam

Related ethnic groups
- Other Sinitic peoples; (Han Chinese, Bai, Taz, Dungan); Dai Paxi, Kaifeng Jews (by absorption), other

Hui people
- Chinese: 回族
- Literal meaning: Islam ethnicity
Transcriptions
Standard Mandarin
- Hanyu Pinyin: Huízú
- Bopomofo: ㄏㄨㄟˊ ㄗㄨˊ
- Gwoyeu Romatzyh: Hweitzwu
- Wade–Giles: Hui²-tsu²
- Tongyong Pinyin: Hueí-zú
- IPA: [xwěɪ.tsǔ]
other Mandarin
- Xiao'erjing: خُوِزُو
- Dungan: Хуэйзў
Wu
- Romanization: we zoh
Hakka
- Romanization: Fui-tshuk
Yue: Cantonese
- Yale Romanization: wuìh juhk
- Jyutping: wui4 zuk6
Southern Min
- Hokkien POJ: Hôe-cok
- Teochew Peng'im: Huê-tsôk
Eastern Min
- Fuzhou BUC: Huòi-cŭk

The Hui people (Note: Chinese: 回族; pinyin: Huízú, Xiao'erjing: خُوِزُو, Dungan: Хуэйзў) are an East Asian ethnoreligious group predominantly composed of Chinese-speaking adherents of Islam. They are distributed throughout China, mainly in the northwestern provinces and in the Zhongyuan region. According to the 2020 census, China is home to approximately 11.3 million Hui people. Outside China, the 170,000 Dungan people of Kazakhstan and Kyrgyzstan, the Panthays in Myanmar and many of the Chin Haws in Thailand are also considered part of the Hui ethnicity.

The Hui were referred to as Hanhui (Note: Chinese: 汉回; pinyin: hànhuí) to be distinguished from the Turkic Muslims, which were referred to as Chanhui. (Note: Chinese: 缠回; pinyin: chánhuí) The Republic of China (1912–1949) government also recognised the Hui as a branch of the Han Chinese rather than a separate ethnic group. In the National Assembly of the Republic of China, the Hui were referred to as Nationals in China proper with special convention. The Hui were referred to as Muslim Han people (Note: Chinese: 汉人回教徒; pinyin: hànrén huíjiàotú) by Bai Chongxi, the Minister of National Defense of the Republic of China at the time and the founder of the Chinese Muslim Association. Some scholars refer to this group as Han Chinese Muslims, (Note: Chinese: 汉族穆斯林; pinyin: hànzú mùsīlín) Han Muslims, (Note: Chinese: 汉穆; pinyin: hànmù) Chinese Muslims or Sino-Muslims. While others call them Chinese-speaking Muslims or Sinophone Muslims.

After the establishment of the People's Republic of China, although the Hui did not meet the Stalinist criteria for recognition of an ethnicity, the Hui was still recognised as a separate ethnicity from Han Chinese in 1954. The government defines the Hui people as all Muslim populations not included in China's other ethnic groups; they are therefore distinct from other Muslim groups such as the Uyghurs.

The Hui predominantly speak Chinese, while using some Arabic and Persian phrases. The Hui ethnic group is unique among Chinese ethnic minorities in that it is not associated with a non-Sinitic language. The Hui have a distinct connection with Islamic culture. For example, they follow Islamic dietary laws and reject the consumption of pork, the most commonly consumed meat in China, and have therefore developed their own variation of Chinese cuisine. Hui traditional dress includes white caps (taqiyah) worn by some men and headscarves worn by some women, similar to customs in many Islamic cultures.

== Definition ==
=== Ancestry ===
Hui people descend from Han Chinese and Silk Road immigrants. Their ancestors were of primarily East Asian and Central Asian origin, with some Middle Eastern ancestry from ethnic groups such as Arabs and Iranians, who spread Islam. 6.7 percent of Hui peoples' genetics have a Middle Eastern origin, however most Hui samples have very similar characteristics to other East Asian populations, revealing a common genetic makeup. They show significant genetic homogeneity with the Han Chinese population in Linxia and with other East Asian populations rather than European or Middle Eastern, supporting a simple cultural diffusion as the origin of the Hui in China. Several medieval Chinese dynasties, particularly the Tang, Song and Mongol Yuan dynasties, encouraged immigration from predominantly Muslim Central Asia, with both dynasties welcoming traders from these regions and appointing Central Asian officials. In subsequent centuries, the immigrants gradually mixed with the Han Chinese, eventually forming the Hui.

Included among the Hui in Chinese census statistics (and not officially recognized as separate ethnic groups) are members of a few small non-Chinese-speaking communities. These include several thousand Utsuls in southern Hainan Province, who speak an Austronesian language (Tsat) related to the language of the Vietnamese Champa Muslim minority, who according to anthropologist Dru Gladney, descend from Champa people who migrated to Hainan. A small Muslim minority among Yunnan's Bai people are classified as Hui as well, although they speak Bai. Some groups of Tibetan Muslims are classified as Hui as well.

=== Genetics ===
A study in 2004 calculated that 6.7 percent of Hui peoples' matrilineal genetics have a West-Eurasian origin and 93.3% are East-Eurasian, reflecting historical records of the population's frequent intermarriage, especially with Mongol women. Studies of the Ningxia and Guizhou Hui also found only minor genetic contributions from West-Eurasian populations. Analysis of the Guizhou Hui's Y chromosomes showed a high degree of paternal North or Central Asian heritage, indicating the population formed through male-dominated migration, potentially via a northern route, followed by massive assimilation of Guizhou aborigines into Han Chinese and Hui Muslims.

The East Asian Y-chromosome haplogroup O-M122 is found in large quantities, about 24–30%, in other Muslims groups close to the Hui like the Dongxiangs, Bo'an, and Salar people. While the Y chromosome haplogroup R1a (found among Central Asians, South Asians and Europeans) are found among 17–28% of them. Western mtDNA makes up 6.6% to 8%. Other haplogroups include D-M174, N1a1-Tat, and Q, commonly found among East Asians and Siberians. The majority of Tibeto-Burmans, Han Chinese, and Ningxia and Liaoning Hui share paternal Y chromosomes of East Asian origin which are unrelated to Middle Easterners and Europeans. In contrast to distant Middle Easterners and Europeans with whom the Muslims of China are not significantly related, East Asians, Han Chinese, and most of the Hui and Dongxiang of Linxia share more genes with each other. This indicates that native East Asian populations were culturally assimilated, and that the Hui population was formed through a process of cultural diffusion.

An overview study in 2021 estimated that West Eurasian-related admixture among the average Northwestern Chinese minority groups was at ~9.1%, with the remainder being dominant East-Eurasian ancestry at ~90.9%. The study also showed that there is a close genetic affinity among these ethnic minorities in Northwest China (including Uyghurs, Huis, Dongxiangs, Bonans, Yugurs and Salars) and that these cluster closely with other East Asian people, especially in Xinjiang, followed by Mongolic, and Tungusic speakers, indicating the probability of a shared recent common ancestor of "Altaic speakers". A genome study, using the ancestry-informative SNP (AISNP) analysis, found only 3.66% West-Eurasian-like admixture among Hui people, while the Uyghurs harbored the relative highest amount of West-Eurasian-like admixture at 36.30%.

=== Official ===
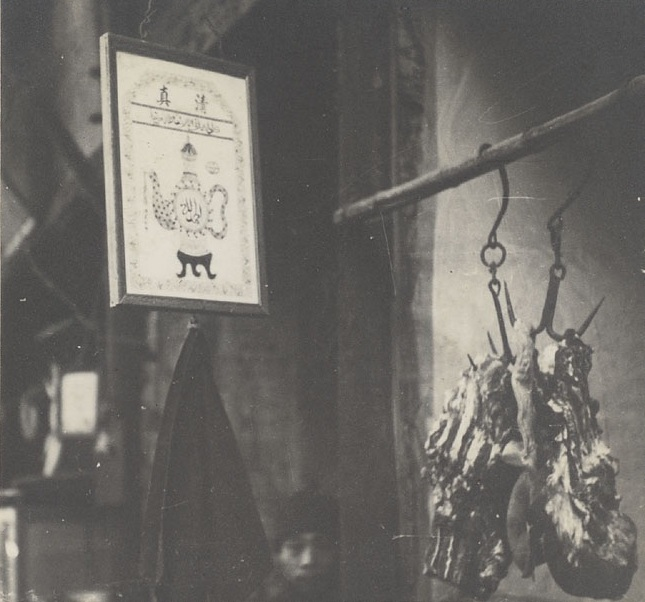
A halal meat store sign in Hankou, c. 1934–1935.

After the establishment of the People's Republic of China in 1949, the term "Hui" was applied by the Chinese government to one of China's ten historically Islamic minorities. Today, the Chinese government defines the Hui people as an ethnicity without regard to religion, and includes those with Hui ancestry who do not practice Islam.

Chinese census statistics count among the Hui (and not as officially recognized separate ethnic groups) the Muslim members of a few small non-Chinese-speaking communities. These include several thousand Utsuls in southern Hainan Province, who speak an Austronesian language (Tsat) related to the language of the Vietnamese Champa Muslim minority. According to anthropologist Dru Gladney, they descend from Champa people who migrated to Hainan. A small Muslim minority among Yunnan's Bai people are classified as Hui as well, although they speak Bai. Some groups of Tibetan Muslims are classified as Hui as well.

=== Huihui ===
Huihui (回回) was the usual generic term for China's Muslims (White Hui), Persian Christians (Black Hui) and Jews (Blue Hui) during the Ming and Qing dynasties. It is thought to have had its origin in the earlier Huihe (回紇) or Huihu (回鶻), which was the name for the Uyghur State of the 8th and 9th centuries. Although the ancient Uyghurs were not Muslims the name Huihui came to refer to foreigners, regardless of language or origin, by the time of the Yuan (1271–1368) and Ming dynasties (1368–1644). The use of Hui to denote all foreigners—Muslims, Nestorian Christians, or Jews—reflects bureaucratic terminology developed over the Yuan and Ming dynasties. Arab were white cap, Persians black cap and Jews blue cap Huihui. Islamic mosques and Jewish synagogues at the time were denoted by the same word, Qīngzhēnsì (清真寺: Temple of Purity and Truth).

Kublai Khan called both foreign Jews and Muslims in China Huihui when he forced them to stop halal and kosher methods of preparing food:

"Among all the [subject] alien peoples only the Hui-hui say "we do not eat Mongol food". [Cinggis Qa'an replied:] "By the aid of heaven we have pacified you; you are our slaves. Yet you do not eat our food or drink. How can this be right?" He thereupon made them eat. "If you slaughter sheep, you will be considered guilty of a crime." He issued a regulation to that effect ... [In 1279/1280 under Qubilai] all the Muslims say: "if someone else slaughters [the animal] we do not eat". Because the poor people are upset by this, from now on, Musuluman [Muslim] Huihui and Zhuhu [Jewish] Huihui, no matter who kills [the animal] will eat [it] and must cease slaughtering sheep themselves, and cease the rite of circumcision."

The widespread and rather generic application of the name Huihui in Ming China was attested to by foreign visitors as well. Matteo Ricci, the first Jesuit to reach Beijing (1598), noted that "Saracens are everywhere in evidence ... their thousands of families are scattered about in nearly every province" Ricci noted that the term Huihui or Hui was applied by Chinese not only to "Saracens" (Muslims) but also to Chinese Jews and supposedly even to Christians. In fact, when the reclusive Wanli Emperor first saw a picture of Ricci and Diego de Pantoja, he supposedly exclaimed, "Hoei, hoei. It is quite evident that they are Saracens", and had to be told by a eunuch that they actually weren't, "because they ate pork". The 1916 Encyclopædia of Religion and Ethics, Volume 8 said that Chinese Muslims always called themselves Huihui or Huizi, and that neither themselves nor other people called themselves Han, and they disliked people calling them Dungan. French army Commandant Viscount D'Ollone wrote a report on what he saw among Hui in 1910. He reported that due to religion, Hui were classed as a different nationality from Han as if they were one of the other minority groups.

Huizu is now the standard term for the "Hui nationality" (ethnic group), and Huimin, for "Hui people" or "a Hui person". The traditional expression Huihui, its use now largely restricted to rural areas, would sound quaint, if not outright demeaning, to modern urban Chinese Muslims.

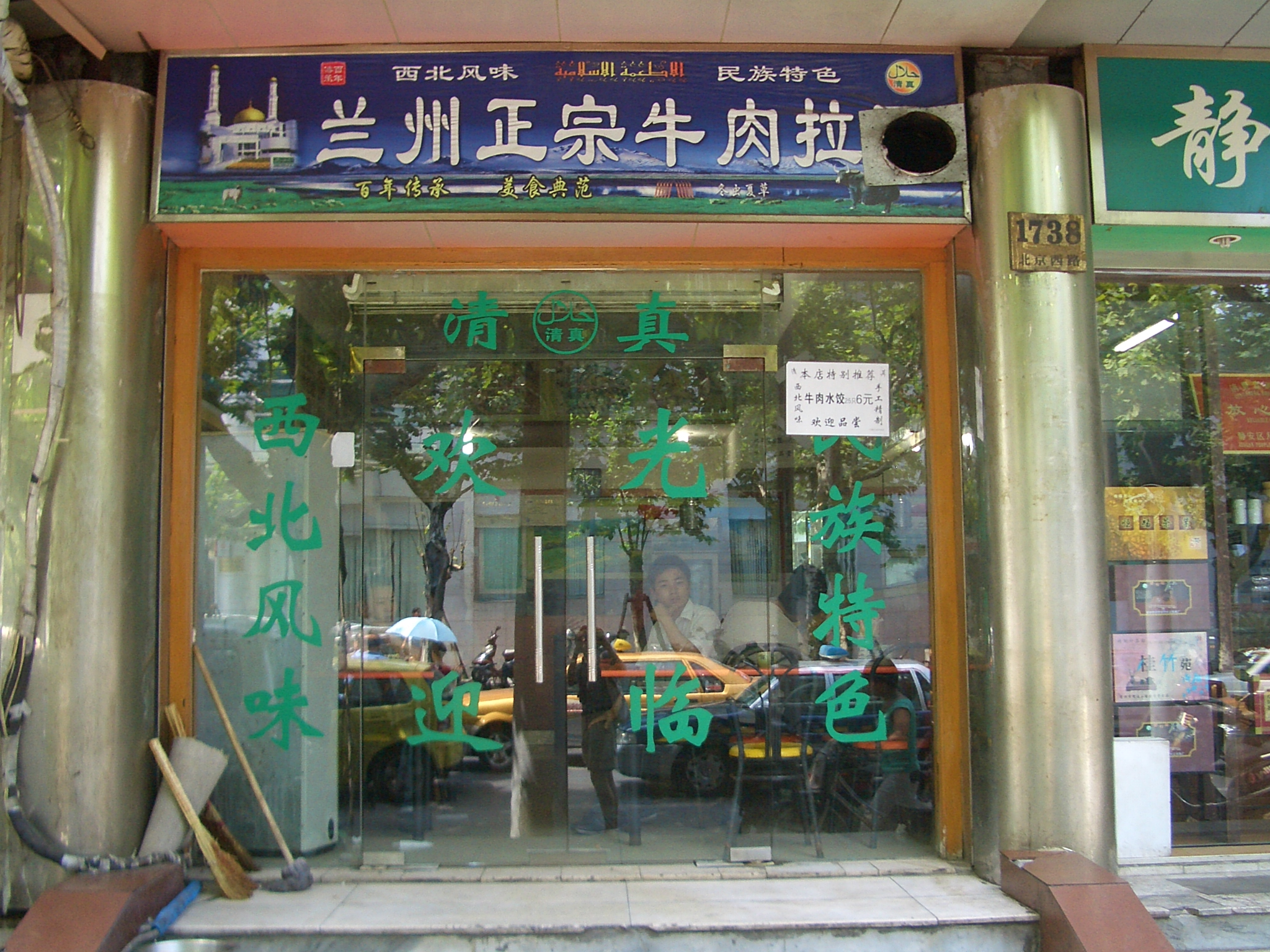
Halal (清真) restaurants offering Northwestern beef lamian can be found throughout the country

=== Other nomenclature ===
Islam was originally called Dashi Jiao during the Tang dynasty, when Muslims first appeared in China. "Dashi Fa" literally means "Arab law" in Old Chinese. Since almost all Muslims in China were exclusively foreign Arabs or Persians at the time, it was rarely mentioned by the Chinese, unlike other religions like Zoroastrism or Mazdaism, and Nestorian Christianity, which gained followings in China. As an influx of foreigners, such as Persians, Jews and Christians, the majority of whom were Muslims who came from western regions, were labelled as Semu people, but were also mistaken by Chinese for Uyghur, due to them coming from the west (Uyghur lands). The name "Hui Hui" was applied to them, and eventually became the name applied to Muslims.

Another, probably unrelated, early use of the word Huihui comes from the History of Liao, which mentions Yelü Dashi, the 12th-century founder of the Kara-Khitan Khanate, defeating the Huihui Dashibu (回回大食部) people near Samarkand—apparently, referring to his defeat of the Khwarazm ruler Ahmed Sanjar in 1141. Khwarazm is referred to as Huihuiguo in the Secret History of the Mongols as well.

While Huihui or Hui remained a generic name for all Muslims in Imperial China, specific terms were sometimes used to refer to particular groups, e.g. Chantou Hui ("turbaned Hui") for Uyghurs, Dongxiang Hui and Sala Hui for Dongxiang and Salar people, and sometimes even Han Hui (漢回) ("Chinese Hui") for the (presumably Chinese-speaking) Muslims more assimilated into the Chinese mainstream society.

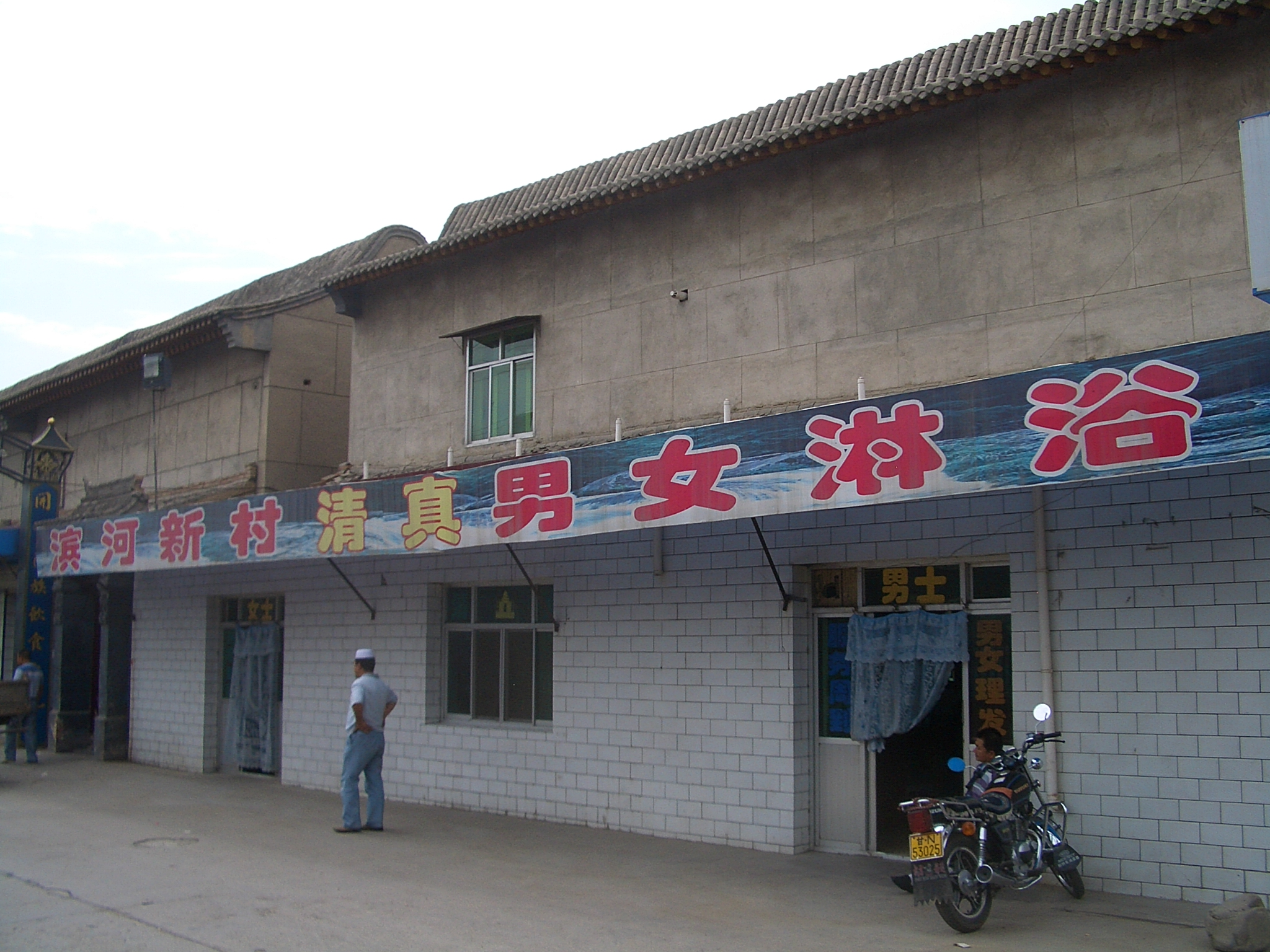
A halal (清真) bathhouse in Linxia City

In the 1930s, the Chinese Communist Party (CCP) defined the term Hui as indicating only Sinophone Muslims. In 1941, this was clarified by a CCP committee comprising ethnic policy researchers in a treatise entitled "On the question of Huihui Ethnicity" (回回民族问题, Huíhui mínzú wèntí). This treatise defined the characteristics of the Hui nationality as an ethnic group associated with, but not defined by, Islam and descended primarily from Muslims who migrated to China during the Mongol-founded Yuan dynasty (1271–1368), as distinct from the Uyghur and other Turkic-speaking ethnic groups in Xinjiang. The Nationalist government by contrast recognised all Muslims as one of "the five peoples"—alongside the Manchus, Mongols, Tibetans, and Han Chinese—that constituted the Republic of China.

A traditional Chinese term for Islam is "回教" (pinyin: Huíjiào, literally "the religion of the Hui"). However, since the early days of the PRC, thanks to the arguments of such Marxist Hui scholars as Bai Shouyi, the standard term for "Islam" within the PRC has become the transliteration "伊斯蘭教" (pinyin: Yīsīlán jiào, literally "Islam religion"). The more traditional term Huijiao remains in use in Singapore, Taiwan and other overseas Chinese communities.

Qīngzhēn: (清真, literally "pure and true") has also been a popular term for Muslim culture since the Yuan or Ming dynasty. Gladney suggested that a good translation for it would be the Arabic tahára. i.e. "ritual or moral purity" The usual term for a mosque is qīngzhēn sì (清真寺), i.e. "true and pure temple", and qīngzhēn is commonly used to refer to halal eating establishments and bathhouses.

In contrast, the Uyghurs were called "Chan Tou Hui" ("Turban Headed Muslim"), and the Turkic Salars called "Sala Hui" (Salar Muslim), while Turkic speakers often referred to Hui as "Dungan".

Zhongyuan ren: During the Qing dynasty, the term Zhongyuan ren (中原人; 'people from the Central Plain') was the term for all Chinese, encompassing Han Chinese and Hui in Xinjiang or Central Asia. While the Hui are not Han, they consider themselves to be Chinese and include themselves in the larger group of Zhongyuan ren. The Dungan people, descendants of Hui who fled to Central Asia, called themselves Zhongyuan ren in addition to the standard labels Lao Huihui and Huizi. Zhongyuan ren was used by Turkic Muslims to refer to ethnic Chinese. When Central Asian invaders from Kokand invaded Kashgar, in a letter the Kokandi commander criticised the Kashgari Turkic Muslim Ishaq for allegedly not behaving like a Muslim and wanting to be a Zhongyuan ren (Chinese).

Some Uyghurs barely see any difference between Hui and Han. A Uyghur social scientist, Dilshat, regarded the Hui as the same people as Han, deliberately calling Hui people Han and dismissing the Hui as having only a few hundred years of history.

Pusuman: Pusuman was a name used by Chinese during the Yuan dynasty. It could have been a corruption of Musalman or another name for Persians. It means either Muslim or Persian. Pusuman Kuo (Pusuman Guo) referred to the country where they came from. The name "Pusuman zi" (pusuman script), was used to refer to the script that the Huihui were using.

Muslim Chinese: The term Chinese Muslim is sometimes used to refer to Hui people, given that they speak Chinese, in contrast to, e.g., Turkic-speaking Salars. During the Qing dynasty, Chinese Muslim (Han Hui) was sometimes used to refer to Hui people, which differentiated them from non-Chinese-speaking Muslims. However, not all Hui are Muslims, nor are all Chinese Muslims, Hui. For example, Li Yong is a famous Han Chinese who practices Islam and Hui Liangyu is a notable atheist Hui. In addition, most Uyghurs, Kazakhs, Kirghiz and Dongxiang in China are Muslims, but are not Hui.

John Stuart Thomson, who traveled in China, called them "Mohammedan Chinese". They have also been called "Chinese Mussulmans", when Europeans wanted to distinguish them from Han Chinese.

=== Non-Muslim Hui ===
Throughout history, the identity of Hui people has been fluid, often changing as was convenient. Some identified as Hui out of interest in their ancestry or because of government benefits. These Hui are concentrated on the southeast coast of China, especially Fujian province.

Some Hui clans around Quanzhou in Fujian, such as the Ding and Guo families, identify themselves by ethnicity and no longer practice Islam. In recent years, more of these clans have identified as Hui, increasing the official population. They provided evidence of their ancestry and were recognized as Hui. Many clans across Fujian had genealogies that demonstrated Hui ancestry. These clans inhabited Fujian, Taiwan, Singapore, Indonesia and the Philippines. None of these clans were Muslims but they do not offer pork during their ancestral worship.

In Taiwan, the Hui clans who followed Koxinga to Formosa to defeat the Dutch settlers no longer observe Islam and their descendants embrace the Chinese folk religion. The Taiwanese branch of the Guo (Kuo in Taiwan) clan with Hui ancestry does not practice Islam, yet does not offer pork at their ancestral shrines. The Chinese Muslim Association counts these people as Muslims. Also on Taiwan, one branch of the Ding (Ting) clan that descended from Sayyid Ajjal Shams al-Din Omar resides in Taisi Township in Yunlin County. They trace their descent through him via the Quanzhou Ding family of Fujian. While pretending to be Han Chinese in Fujian, they initially practiced Islam when they came to Taiwan 200 years ago, but their descendants have embraced Buddhism or Taoism.

An attempt was made by the Chinese Islamic Society to convert the Fujian Hui of Fujian back to Islam in 1983, by sending four Ningxia imams to Fujian. This futile endeavour ended in 1986, when the final Ningxia imam left. A similar endeavour in Taiwan also failed.

Until 1982, a Han could "become" Hui by converting to Islam. Thereafter, a converted Han counts instead as a "Muslim Han". Symmetrically, Hui people consider other Hui who do not observe Islamic practices as still Hui, and that their Hui nationality cannot be lost. For both of these reasons, simply calling them "Chinese Muslims" is no longer accurate, strictly speaking, just as with Bosniaks in former Yugoslavia.

== Population ==
The Hui nationality is the most widely distributed ethnic minority in China, and it is also the main ethnic minority in many provinces. There are 11,377,914 Hui people in China (2020 census).

Ningxia Hui Autonomous Region and Gansu Province have a Hui population of more than one million. In Ningxia, 33.95% of the population are of Hui ethnicity. Hui are the major minority in Qinghai (15.62%), Gansu and Xinjiang and is the overall major minority in Henan.

Provincial distribution of the Hui, from the 2020 census

Province-level division	Hui population	% of China's Hui population
Ningxia Hui Autonomous Region	2,523,581	22.18%
Gansu Province	1,342,385	11.80%
Xinjiang Uyghur Autonomous Region	1,102,928	9.69%
Henan Province	948,553	8.34%
Qinghai Province	946,273	8.32%
Yunnan Province	737,548	6.48%
Hebei Province	567,106	4.98%
Shandong Province	552,215	4.85%
Beijing Municipality	274,112	2.41%
Liaoning Province	216,379	1.90%
Other	3,166,834	27.84%

=== Subgroups ===
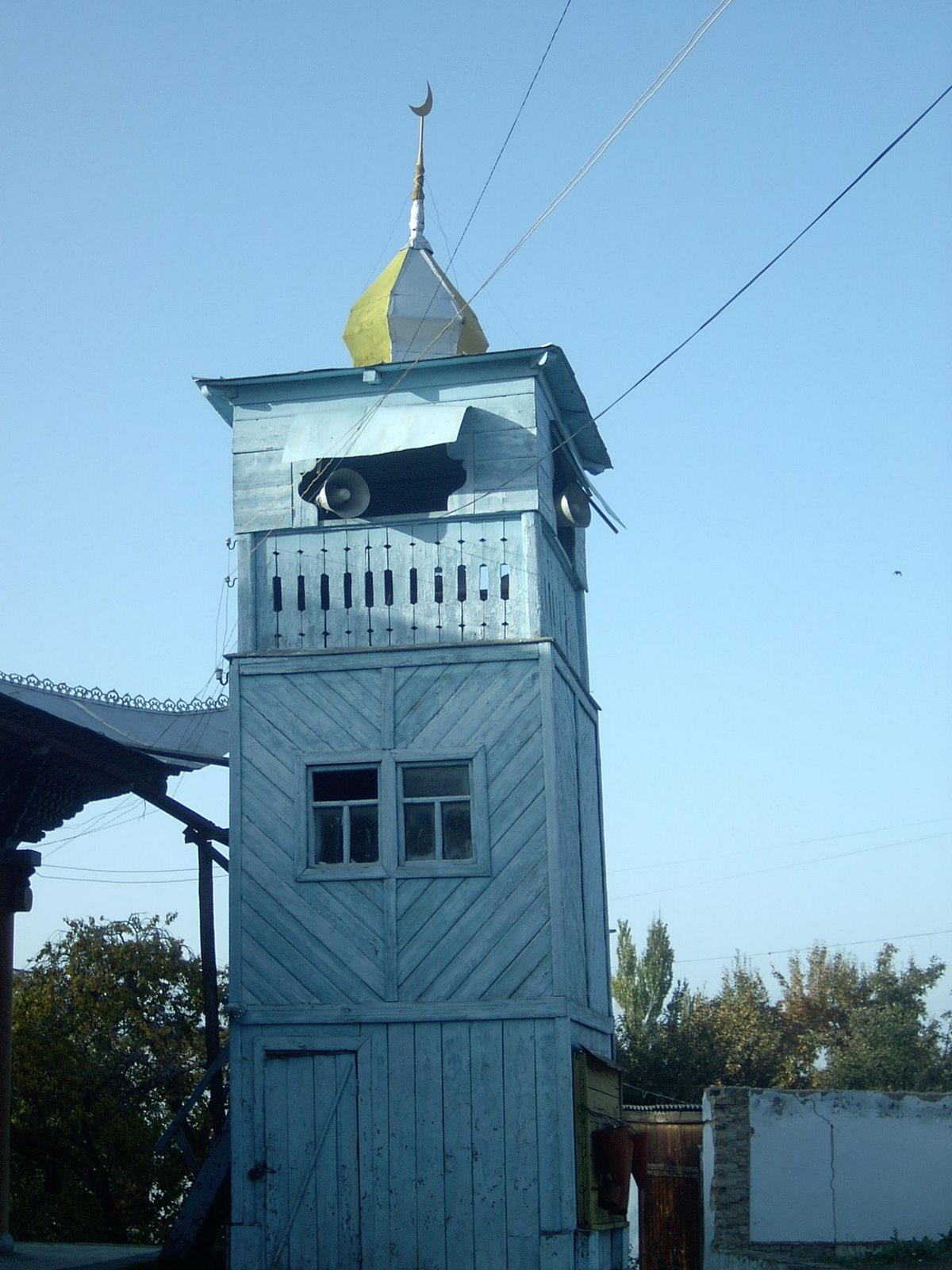
The minaret of the Dungan mosque in Karakol, Kyrgyzstan

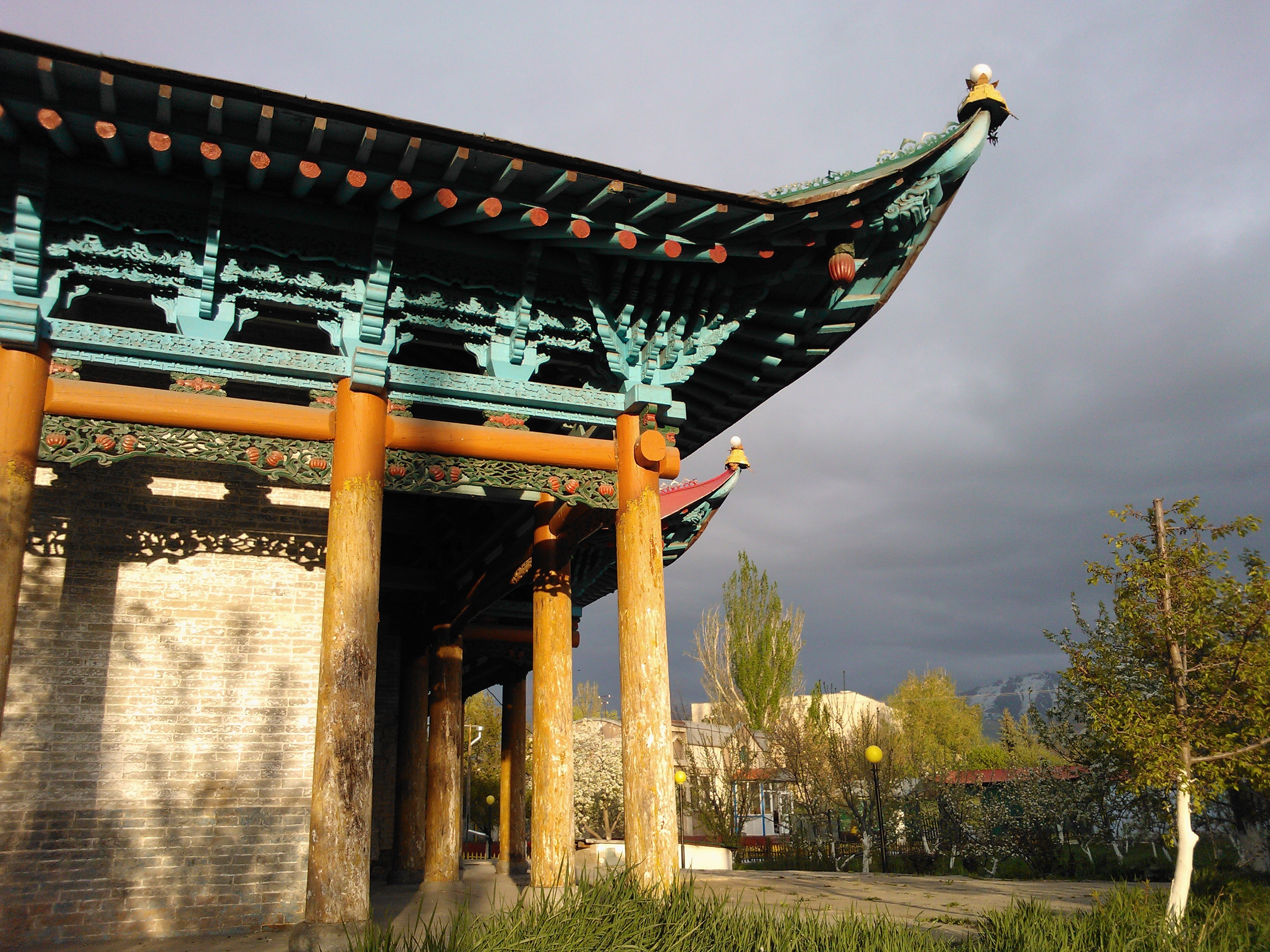
Dungan mosque in Karakol, Kyrgyzstan

Dungan (simplified Chinese: 东干族; traditional Chinese: 東干族; pinyin: Dōnggānzú; Russian: Дунгане) is a term used in Central Asia and in Xinjiang to refer to Chinese-speaking Muslim people. In the censuses of Russia and Central Asian nations, the Hui are distinguished from Chinese, termed Dungans. However, in both China and Central Asia members of this ethnic group call themselves Lao Huihui or Zhongyuan ren, rather than Dungan. Most Dungans living in Central Asia are descendants of Hui people from Gansu and Shaanxi.

Hui people are referred to by Central Asian Turkic speakers and Tajiks by the ethnonym Dungan. Joseph Fletcher cited Turkic and Persian manuscripts related to the preaching of the 17th century Kashgarian Sufi master Muhammad Yūsuf (or, possibly, his son Afaq Khoja) inside the Ming Empire (in today's Gansu and/or Qinghai), where the preacher allegedly converted ulamā-yi Tunganiyyāh (i.e., "Dungan ulema") into Sufism.

As early as the 1830s, Dungan, in various spellings appeared in both English and German, referring to the Hui people of Xinjiang. For example, James Prinsep in 1835 mentioned Muslim "Túngánis" in Chinese Tartary. The word (mostly in the form "Dungani" or "Tungani", sometimes "Dungens" or "Dungans") acquired currency in English and other western languages when books in the 1860–1870s discussed the Dungan Revolt.

Later authors continued to use variants of the term for Xinjiang Hui people. For example, Owen Lattimore, writing ca. 1940, maintained the terminological distinction between these two related groups: the Donggan or "Tungkan" (the older Wade-Giles spelling for "Dungan"), described by him as the descendants of the Gansu Hui people resettled in Xinjiang in the 17–18th centuries, vs. e.g. the "Gansu Moslems" or generic "Chinese Moslems".

The name "Dungan" sometimes referred to all Muslims coming from China proper, such as Dongxiang and Salar in addition to Hui. Reportedly, the Hui disliked the term Dungan, calling themselves either Huihui or Huizi.

In the Soviet Union and its successor countries, the term "Dungans" (дунгане) became the standard name for the descendants of Chinese-speaking Muslims who emigrated in the 1870s and 1880s to the Russian Empire, mostly to today's Kyrgyzstan and south-eastern Kazakhstan.

=== Panthay ===
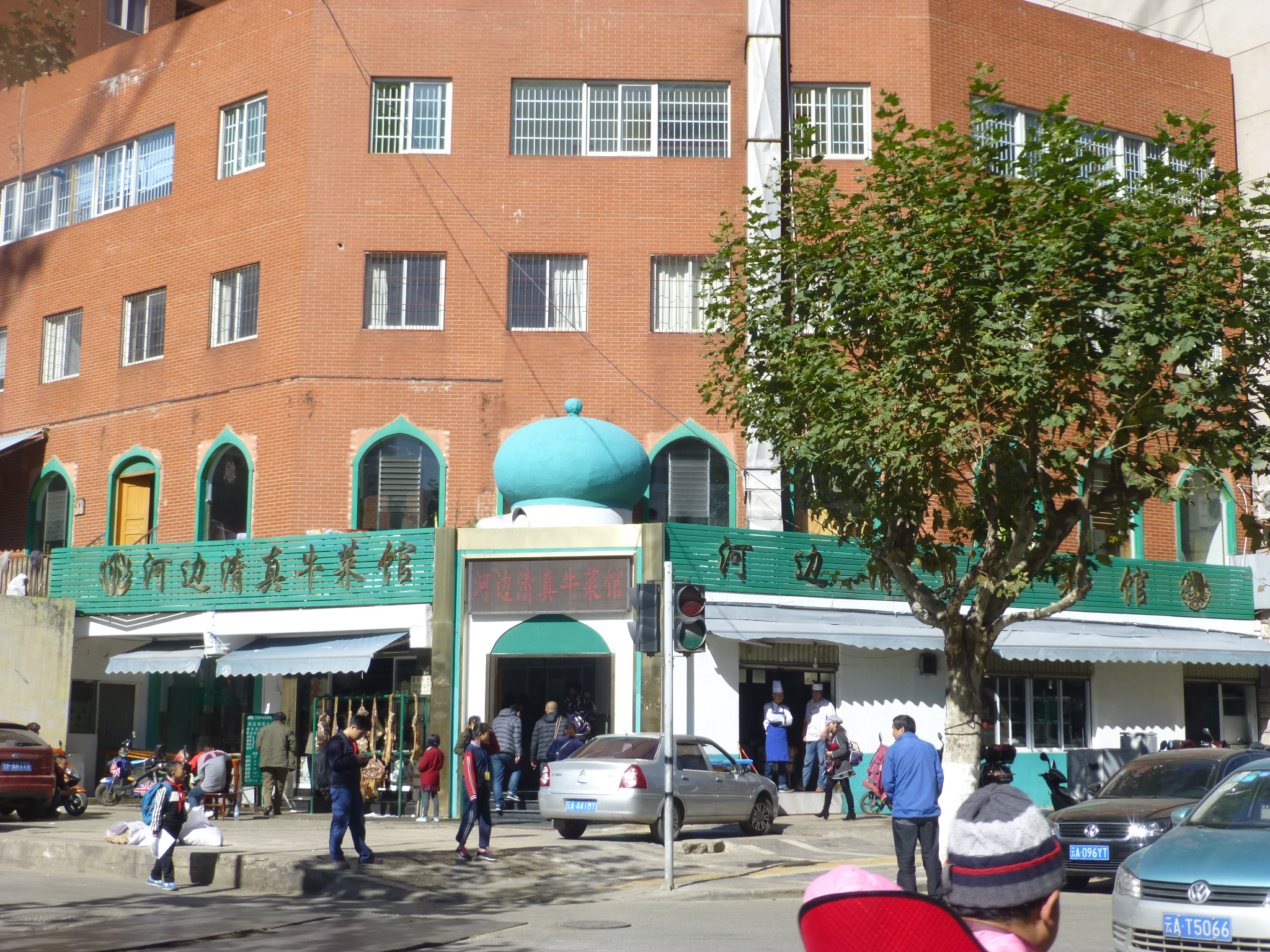
Muslim restaurant in Kunming, Yunnan

The Panthay are a group of Chinese Muslims in Myanmar (Burma) and Yunnan Province. In Thailand, Chinese Muslims are referred to as Chin Ho (จีนฮ่อ).

=== Utsuls ===
The Utsuls (known as Huíhuī in Chinese) of Hainan are a Chamic-speaking ethnic group which lives southernmost tip of the island near the city of Sanya. They are thought to be descendants of Cham refugees who fled their homeland of Champa in what is now modern Central Vietnam to escape the Cham-Vietnamese wars. Although they are culturally, ethnically and linguistically distinct from the Hui, the Chinese government nevertheless classifies them as Hui due to their Islamic faith.

== History ==
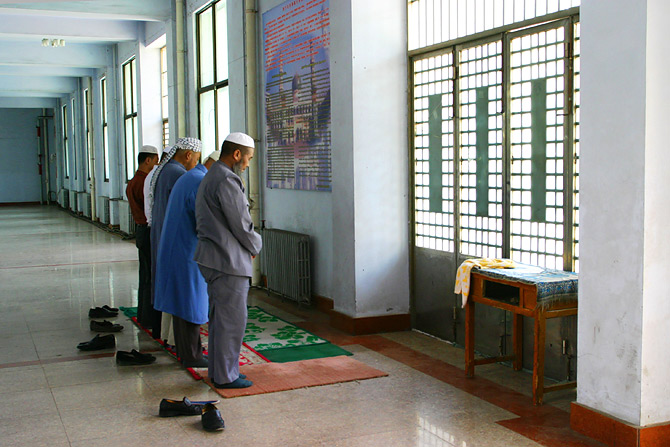
Hui people praying in the Dongguan Mosque, Xining

Many Hui are direct descendants of Silk Road travelers. On the southeast coast (e.g., Guangdong, Fujian) and in major trade centers elsewhere in China, some are of mixed local and foreign descent. The foreign element, although greatly diluted, came primarily from Iranian (Bosi) traders, who brought Islam to China. These foreigners settled and gradually intermarried, while assimilating into Chinese culture.

Early European explorers speculated that T'ung-kan (Dungans, i.e. Hui, called "Chinese Mohammedans") in Xinjiang, originated from Khorezmians who were transported to China by the Mongols, and descended from a mixture of Chinese, Iranian and Turkic peoples. They also reported that the T'ung-kan were Shafi'ites, as were the Khorezmians.

The Hui people of Yunnan and Northwestern China resulted from the convergence of Mongol, Turkic, and Iranian peoples or other Central Asian settlers recruited by the Yuan dynasty, either as artisans or as officials (the semu). The Hui formed the second-highest stratum in the Yuan ethnic hierarchy (after the Mongols but above Chinese). A proportion of the ancestral nomad or military ethnic groups were originally Nestorian Christians, many of whom later converted to Islam under the Ming and Qing dynasties.

However, Hui peoples from Gansu, along with their Dongxian neighbors, did not receive substantial gene flow from Western and Central Asia or European populations during their Islamization. Chi Ma Tan Jun, a Yuan Dynasty army, consisting of Muslims from western tribes around 13–14th centuries AD, were stationed on several places from Mobei, Dadu (historical name of Beijing), to the South and northwest of Yangtze River and Yuanhan River. This followed with their assimilation to the Hui people, which caused the Hui population increased sharply during the Yuan Dynasty.

The formation of large clans of Hui Muslims in Yunnan area were indicated by the appearances of certain figures like Sayyid Ajjal Shams al-Din Omar and Nestardin, local officials in Yuan Dynasty; and Mu Ying, Ha Yuansheng and Ye Daxiong, military officers stationed in Yunnan during Ming and Qing dynasties. Here, the Hui Muslims enjoyed important roles in border trade in Yunnan, which spanning the southwest frontier of China, Thailand and Myanmar.

=== Military service ===
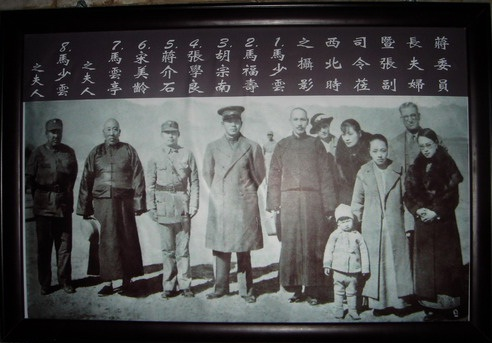
Chiang Kai-shek, head of the Kuomintang with Muslim General Ma Fushou.

Muslims have served extensively in the Chinese military for a long time in Chinese history, as both officials and soldiers, often filling the more distinguished military positions. During the Tang dynasty, 3,000 Chinese soldiers and Arab 3,000 Muslim soldiers were traded to each other in an agreement. In 756, 3,000 Arab mercenaries joined the Chinese against the An Lushan rebellion. A mythical Hui legendary folklore account claims 3,000 Chinese soldiers were swapped by Guo Ziyi with the Muslims for 300 "Hui" soldiers, and said that only 3 Hui survived the war against An Lushan and populated Ningxia. A massacre of thousands of foreign Arab and Persian Muslim merchants and other foreigners by former Yan rebel general Tian Shengong happened during the An Lushan rebellion in the Yangzhou massacre (760), The rebel Huang Chao's army in southern China committed the Guangzhou massacre against over 120,000 to 200,000 foreign Arab and Persian Muslim, Zoroastrian, Jewish and Christian merchants in 878–879 at the seaport and trading entrepot of Guangzhou.

During the Ming dynasty, Hui generals and troops loyal to Ming fought against Mongols and Hui loyal to the Yuan dynasty in the Ming conquest of Yunnan. Hui also fought for the emperor against aboriginal tribes in southern China during the Miao Rebellions. Many Hui soldiers of the Ming dynasty then settled in Yunnan and Hunan provinces.

During the Qing dynasty, Hui troops in the Imperial army helped crush Hui rebels during the Dungan Revolt and Panthay Rebellion. The Qing administration in Xinjiang also preferred to use Hui as police. Yang Zengxin, the Han Chinese governor of Xinjiang, extensively relied on Hui generals like Ma Shaowu and Ma Fuxing. Qing Muslim general Zuo Baogui (1837–1894), from Shandong province, was killed in Pingyang in Korea by Japanese cannon fire in 1894 while defending the city, where a memorial to him stands. Hui troops also fought western armies for the first time in the Boxer Rebellion, winning battles including the Battle of Langfang and Battle of Beicang. These troops were the Kansu Braves led by General Dong Fuxiang.

Military service continued into the Republic of China period. After the Kuomintang party took power, Hui participation in the military reached new levels. Qinghai and Ningxia were created out of Gansu province, and the Kuomintang appointed Hui generals as military governors of all three provinces. They became known as the Ma Clique. Many Muslim Salar joined the army in the Republic era; they and Dongxiang who have joined the army are described as being given "eating rations" meaning military service.

The Chinese government appointed Ma Fuxiang as military governor of Suiyuan. Ma Fuxiang commented on the willingness for Hui people to become martyrs in battle (see Martyrdom in Islam), saying:

They have not enjoyed the educational and political privileges of the Han Chinese, and they are in many respects primitive. But they know the meaning of fidelity, and if I say "do this, although it means death," they cheerfully obey.

Hui generals and soldiers fought for the Republic against Tibet in the Sino-Tibetan War, against Uyghur rebels in the Kumul Rebellion, the Soviet Union in the Soviet Invasion of Xinjiang and against Japan in the Second Sino Japanese War. The Japanese planned to invade Ningxia from Suiyuan in 1939 and create a Hui puppet state. The next year in 1940, the Japanese were defeated militarily by Kuomintang Muslim general Ma Hongbin. Ma Hongbin's Hui Muslim troops launched further attacks against Japan in the Battle of West Suiyuan. The Chinese Islamic Association issued "A message to all Muslims in China from the Chinese Islamic Association for National Salvation" in Ramadan of 1940 during the Second Sino-Japanese War.

We have to implement the teaching "the love of the fatherland is an article of faith" by the Prophet Muhammad and to inherit the Hui's glorious history in China. In addition, let us reinforce our unity and participate in the twice more difficult task of supporting a defensive war and promoting religion ... We hope that ahongs and the elite will initiate a movement of prayer during Ramadan and implement group prayer to support our intimate feeling toward Islam. A sincere unity of Muslims should be developed to contribute power towards the expulsion of Japan.

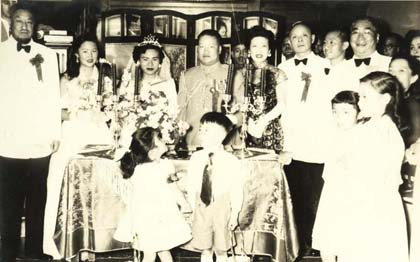
Ma Bufang and Hui children in Egypt.

"Ahong" is the Mandarin Chinese word for "imam". During the war against Japan, the imams supported Muslim resistance, calling for Muslims to participate in the fight against Japan, claiming that casualties would become shaheeds (martyrs). Ma Zhanshan was a Hui guerilla fighter against the Japanese.

Hui forces were known for their anti-communist sentiment, and fought for the Kuomintang against the CCP in the Chinese Civil War, and against rebels during the Ili Rebellion. Bai Chongxi, a Hui general, was appointed to the post of Minister of National Defence, the highest military position in the Republic of China. After the Chinese Communist Revolution and the retreat of the government of the Republic of China to Taiwan, Hui people continued to serve in the military of the Republic as opposed to the CCP-led People's Republic. Ma Bufang became the ambassador of the Republic of China (Taiwan) to Saudi Arabia. His brother, Ma Buqing, remained a military general on Taiwan. Bai Chongxi and Ma Ching-chiang were other Hui who served in Taiwan as military generals.

The PLA recruited Hui soldiers who formally had served under Ma Bufang, as well as Salafi soldiers, to crush the Tibetan revolt in Amdo during the 1959 Tibetan uprising.

=== Politics ===
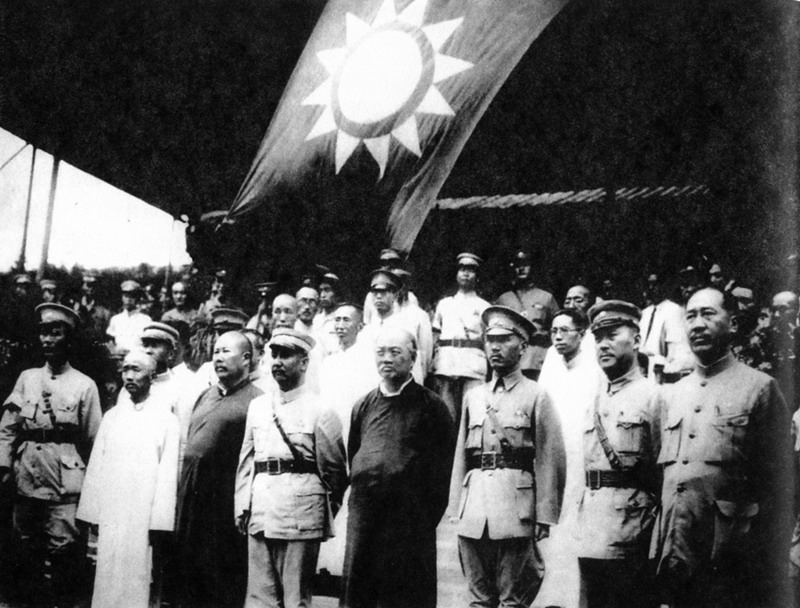
Chinese Generals pay tribute to the Sun Yat-sen Mausoleum at the Temple of the Azure Clouds in Beijing after the success of the Northern Expedition. From right to left, are Generals Cheng Jin, Zhang Zuobao, Chen Diaoyuan, Chiang Kai-shek, Woo Tsin-hang, Wen Xishan, Ma Fuxiang, Ma Sida and Bai Chongxi. (6 July 1928)

The majority of the Hui Muslim Ma Clique Generals were Kuomintang party members and encouraged Chinese nationalism in their provinces. Kuomintang members Ma Qi, Ma Lin (warlord), and Ma Bufang served as military governors of Qinghai, Ma Hongbin served as military governor of Gansu, and Ma Hongkui served as military governor of Ningxia. General Ma Fuxiang was promoted to governor of Anhui and became chairman of Mongolian and Tibetan Affairs. Ma Bufang, Ma Fuxiang, and Bai Chongxi were all members of the Central Executive Committee of the Kuomintang, which ruled China in a one-party state. Member Bai Chongxi helped build the Taipei Grand Mosque on Taiwan. Many members of the Hui Ma Clique were Kuomintang.

Hui put Kuomintang Blue Sky with a White Sun party symbols on their Halal restaurants and shops. A Christian missionary in 1935 took a picture of a Muslim meat restaurant in Hankou that had Arabic and Chinese lettering indicating that it was Halal (fit for Muslim consumption). It had two Kuomintang party symbols on it.

=== Modern period ===
The Hui played an important role in the Second Sino-Japanese War. Japan's attempt to get the Hui people on its side failed, because many generals such as Bai Chongxi, Ma Hongbin, Ma Hongkui, and Ma Bufang were Hui and fought against the Imperial Japanese Army. The Japanese attempted to approach Ma Bufang but could not make any agreement with him. Ma Benzhai led a Hui army in alliance with the CCP against the Japanese. Japanese forced took his mother hostage in an attempt to force Ma's surrender, but she killed herself to prevent him from being forced to choose between family duty and national loyalty. Their story was popularized nationwide by the 1959 film, The Hui Muslim Detachment.

During China's land reform movement (which began after the defeat of the Japanese in the Second Sino-Japanese War and continued in the early years of the People's Republic of China), the CCP encouraged rural women in achieving a "double fanshen"—a revolutionary transformation as both a peasant and a feminist awakening as a woman. The progress of Hui women was promoted as by the party as an example of such a success. Through the rural movement, Hui women were said to have not just received land, but also "freedom over their own bodies." Hui women embraced political participation and the rural revolution. The land reform movement succeeded among Hui people because activists first won over elder generations.

The Cultural Revolution wreaked much havoc on all cultures and ethnicities in China. The quelling of Hui militant rebels at the hands of the People's Liberation Army in Yunnan, known as the Shadian incident, reportedly claimed over 1,600 lives in 1975.

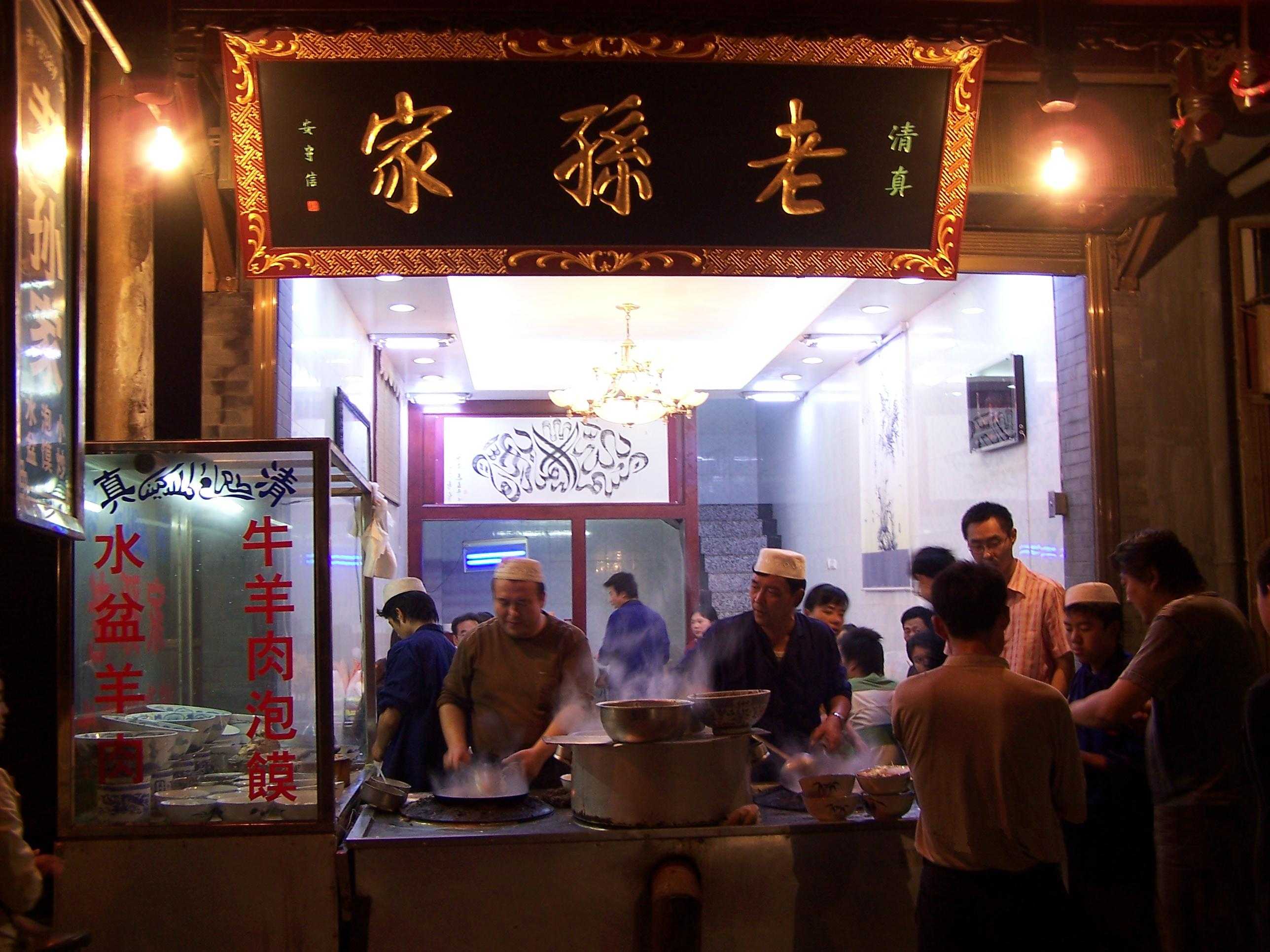
Muslim restaurant in Xi'an

Different Muslim ethnic groups in different regions are treated differently by the Chinese government in regards to religious freedom. A greater freedom is permitted for Hui Muslims, who can practice their religion, build mosques, and have their children attend mosques. Since the 1980s, Islamic private schools have been supported and permitted by the Chinese government in Muslim areas. Although religious education for children is officially forbidden by law in China, the CCP allows Hui Muslims to have their children educated in the religion and attend mosques. After secondary education is completed, China then allows Hui students who would like to, embark on religious studies under an imam.

Hui religious schools are also allowed to establish a large autonomous network of mosques and schools run by a Hui Sufi leader, which was formed with the approval of the Chinese government even though he admitted to attending an event where Osama Bin Laden spoke.

Hui Muslims who are employed by the state are allowed to fast during Ramadan. The number of Hui going on Hajj is expanding. Hui women are allowed to wear veils. Many Hui women wear veils and headscarves. There is a major halal industry and Islamic clothing industry to manufacture Muslim attire such as skull caps, veils, and headscarves in the Hui region of Ningxia.

China banned a book entitled Xing Fengsu ("Sexual Customs") which insulted Islam and placed its authors under arrest in 1989 after protests in Lanzhou and Beijing by Chinese Hui Muslims. During the protests, the Chinese police provided protection to the Hui Muslim protestors, and the Chinese government organized public burnings of the book. The Chinese government assisted them and gave into their demands because Hui do not have a separatist movement.

In 2007, anticipating the coming "Year of the Pig" in the Chinese calendar, depictions of pigs were banned from CCTV "to show respect to Islam, and upon guidance from higher levels of the government".

The Dungan Revolts and Panthay Rebellion were set off by racial antagonism and class warfare, rather than religion. During the first Dungan revolt, from 1862 to 1877, fighting broke out between Uyghur and Hui groups. In the military, imbalances in promotion and wealth were other motives for holding foreigners in poor regard.

In 1936, after Sheng Shicai expelled 20,000 Kazakhs from Xinjiang to Qinghai, the Hui led by Ma Bufang massacred their fellow Muslims, the Kazakhs, until only 135 remained.

The Hui people have had a long presence in Qinghai and Gansu, or what Tibetans call Amdo, although Tibetans have historically dominated local politics. The situation was reversed in 1931 when the Hui general Ma Bufang inherited the governorship of Qinghai, stacking his government with Hui and Salar and excluding Tibetans. In his power base in Qinghai's northeastern Haidong Prefecture, Ma compelled many Tibetans to convert to Islam and acculturate. Tensions also mounted when Hui started migrating into Lhasa in the 1990s. In February 2003, Tibetans rioted against Hui, destroying Hui-owned shops and restaurants. Local Tibetan Buddhist religious leaders led a regional boycott movement that encouraged Tibetans to boycott Hui-owned shops.

Hui Muslims have been alleged to have experienced greater repression of religious activities in recent years. In 2018, paramount leader Xi Jinping issued a directive aimed at the sinicization of Chinese Muslims. Since then, the government has been accused of repressing aspects of Hui culture deemed "Arab". Most of these repressions have been limited to the removal of aesthetically Islamic buildings and symbols, with the government renovating architecture to appear more Chinese and banning Arabic signs in Hui regions. More drastic repressions have been taken, such as closing mosques or removing licenses from imams who have traveled outside of China. In order to sinicize the Hui, schools and mosques in Ningxia have been changed to include traits from traditional Han architecture.

At least two Hui Muslims have allegedly been included in reeducation camps, termed "Vocational Education and Training Centers" which the Chinese government claims are aimed at reforming the political thought of detainees, including extremist religious beliefs and separatist or terrorist sympathies. One or more of the Hui within these camps may have faced torture, and are allegedly grouped in different cells from Kazakhs and Uighurs, and on rare occasion die from stress.

==== Tensions between Hui and Uyghurs ====
Tensions with Uyghurs arose because Qing and Republican Chinese authorities used Hui troops and officials to dominate the Uyghurs and crush Uyghur revolts. Xinjiang's Hui population increased by over 520 percent between 1940 and 1982, an average annual growth of 4.4 percent, while the Uyghur population only grew at 1.7 percent. This dramatic increase in Hui population led inevitably to significant tensions between the Hui and Uyghur populations. Many Hui Muslim civilians were killed by Uyghur rebel troops in the Kizil massacre (1933). Some Uyghurs in Kashgar remember that the Hui army at the 1934 Battle of Kashgar massacred 1,700 to 2,000 Uyghurs, which caused tension as more Hui moved into Kashgar from other parts of China. Some Hui criticize Uyghur separatism and generally do not want to get involved in conflict in other countries. Hui and Uyghur live separately, attending different mosques. During the 2009 rioting in Xinjiang that killed around 200 people, "Kill the Han, kill the Hui" was the recurring cry spread across social media among extremist Uyghurs.

The Uyghur militant organization East Turkestan Islamic Movement's magazine Islamic Turkistan has accused the Chinese "Muslim Brotherhood" (the Yihewani) of being responsible for the moderation of Hui Muslims and the lack of Hui joining militant jihadist groups in addition to blaming other things for the lack of Hui Jihadists, such as the fact that for more than 300 years Hui and Uyghurs have been enemies of each other, no separatist Islamist organizations among the Hui, the fact that the Hui view China as their home, and the fact that the "infidel Chinese" language is the language of the Hui.

Even among Hui Salafis (Sailaifengye) and Uyghur Salafis, there is little coordination or cooperation and the two have totally different political agendas, with the Hui Salafists content to carry out their own teachings and remain politically neutral.

Hui Muslim drug dealers are accused by Uyghur Muslims of pushing heroin onto Uyghurs. There is a typecast image in the public eye of Hui being heroin dealers.

==== Tibetan-Muslim sectarian violence ====
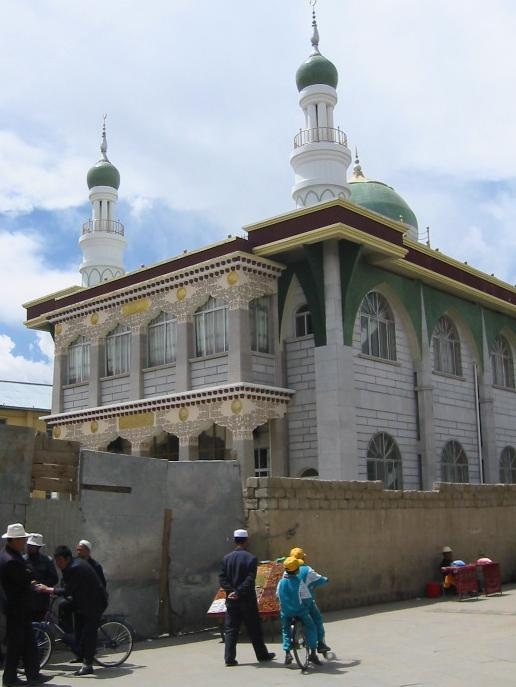
The Lhasa Great Mosque in Tibet

In Tibet, the majority of Muslims are Hui people. Antagonism between Tibetans and Muslims stems from events during the Muslim warlord Ma Bufang's rule such as the Ngolok rebellions and the Sino-Tibetan War, but such hostility was suppressed after the annexation of Tibet by the People's Republic of China. However, renewed Tibetan-Muslim violence broke out in the wake of the gradual liberalization of China, that resulted in increased movement of people, such as Han and Hui, into Tibetan areas. Muslim restaurants were attacked, and apartments and shops of Muslims were set on fire in the riot in mid-March 2008, resulting in death and injury. Tibetans also boycotted Muslim owned businesses. In August 2008, the main mosque in Lhasa was burned down by Tibetans during the 2008 Tibetan unrest. Some Muslims avoided overt display of religious identity in the wake of the violence. Many Hui Muslims also supported the repression of Tibetan separatism by the Chinese government, complicating their relationship. Problems also exist between Chinese-speaking Hui and Tibetan Hui (the Tibetan-speaking Kache minority of Muslims).

==== Sectarian conflict ====
There have been many occurrences of violent sectarian fighting between different Hui sects, mostly dating from the Qing dynasty. This conflict led to the Jahriyya revolt in the 1780s and the second Dungan Revolt in 1895. After a hiatus while the People's Republic of China came to power, sectarian infighting resumed in the 1990s between different sects in Ningxia. In recent years, the Salafi movement in China has increased rapidly among the Hui population, with more mosques occupied under Salafis in China. Several sects refuse to intermarry with each other, and one Sufi sect circulated an anti-Salafi pamphlet in Arabic.

A small but growing number of Hui supported or even joined the Islamic State of Iraq and the Levant. Chinese officials were believed to have ignored Hui Sufis' growing resentment to the expanding Salafi movement until recently. ISIL had released a music video called "I am a mujahid" (我們是Mujahid) in Mandarin to reportedly attract Hui Muslims into joining the organization.

== Relations with other religions ==
Some Hui believed that Islam was the true religion through which Confucianism could be practiced, superior to "barbarian" religions, and accused Buddhists and Daoists of "heresy", like most other Confucian scholars. Among the many Muslims in pre-Chinese Lhasa, the Kokonor Hui community was permitted to maintain the abattoirs outside the confines of the girdling pilgrims' circuit of the city.

Muslim general Ma Bufang allowed polytheists to openly worship and Christian missionaries to station themselves in Qinghai. Ma and other high-ranking Muslim generals attended the Kokonuur Lake ceremony where the God of the Lake was worshipped, and during the ritual, the Chinese national anthem was sung, participants bowed to a portrait of Kuomintang party founder Sun Yat-sen, and to the God of the Lake. Offerings were given to Sun by the participants, including Muslims. Ma Bufang invited Kazakh Muslims to attend the ceremony. Ma Bufang received audiences of Christian missionaries, who sometimes preached the Gospel. His son Ma Jiyuan received a silver cup from the missionaries.

The Muslim Ma Zhu wrote "Chinese religions are different from Islam, but the ideas are the same."

During the Panthay Rebellion, the Muslim leader Du Wenxiu said to a Catholic priest: "I have read your religious works and I have found nothing inappropriate. Muslims and Christians are brothers."

== Culture ==
=== Sects of Islam ===
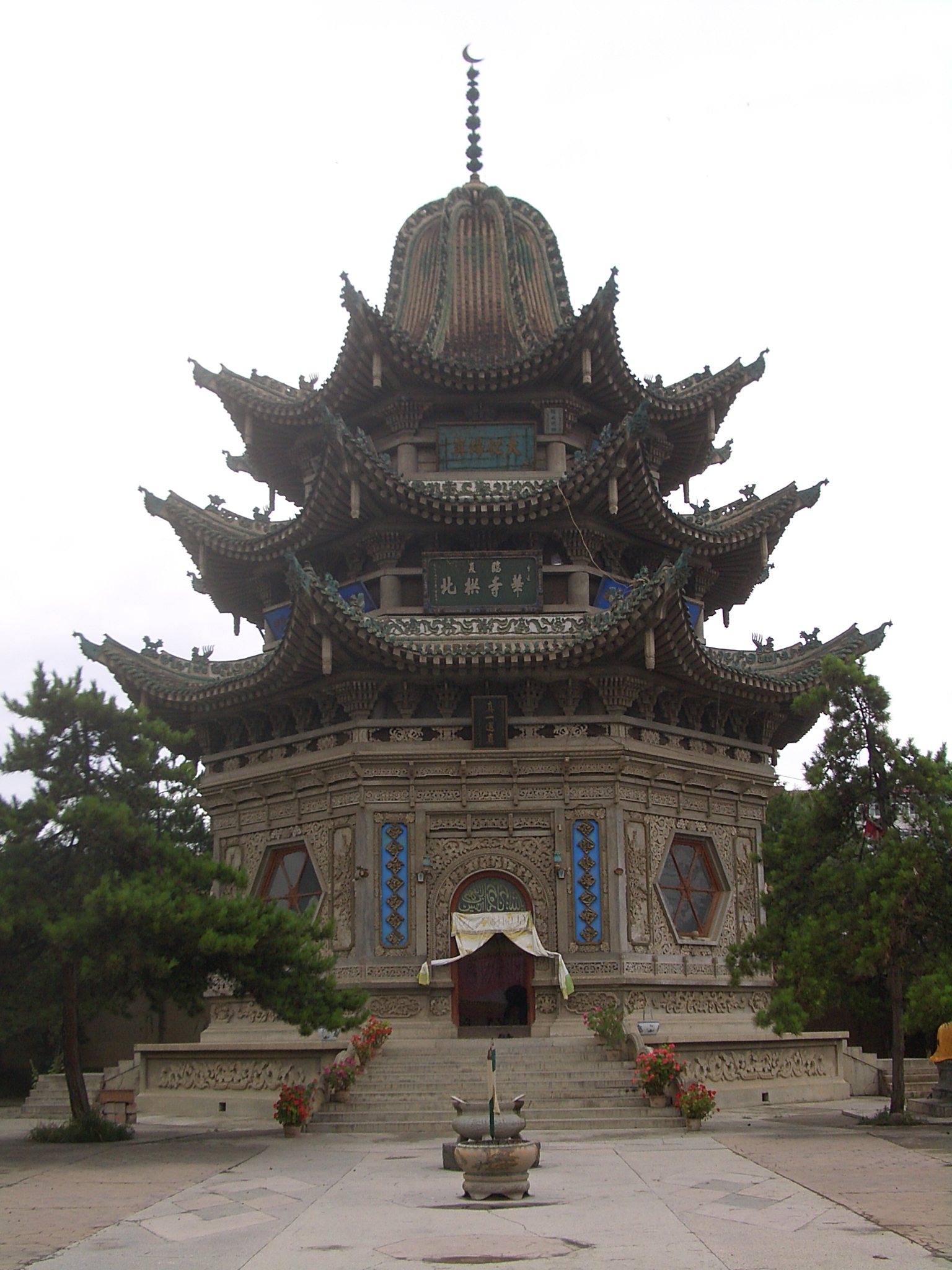
The Sufi mausoleum (gongbei) of Ma Laichi in Linxia City, China.

Most Hui people are Sunni Muslims, and their Islamic sects can be divided into:

- Gedimu (Note: 格底目派) (Old Sect): This is the oldest and most widely followed sect in China. Members typically do not actively proselytise. It is divided into four main Sufi orders, each with its own hereditary leader. Each order has gongbei, which serve as the tombs of its leader.
  - Jahriyya (Note: 哲合忍耶派) (also known as the Loud Chanting Sect (Note: 高念派))
  - Khufiyya (Note: 虎夫耶派) (also known as the Quiet Chanting Sect (Note: 低念派))
  - Qadiriyya (Note: 格底忍耶派) (meaning "The Great One" (Note: "大能者"))
  - Kubrawiyya (Note: 库布忍耶派) (meaning "The Magnificent One" (Note: "伟大者"))
- Yihewani (Note: 伊合瓦尼派) (New Sect): This sect focuses exclusively on the Quran, without establishing any Sufi order, gongbei, or hereditary leadership.
- Salafi (Note: 塞莱菲耶派) (New New Sect (Note: 新新教)): Influenced by Wahhabi thought, this sect aims to reform the New Sect and advocates for a return to the purity and spirituality of early Islam.
- Xidaotang (Note: 西道堂) (Chinese Learning Sect (Note: 汉学派)): This sect, founded on the Chinese translations of Islamic texts by scholars like Liu Zhi, has a centralised religious authority. Its leader serves for life but does not pass down the position hereditarily.

Ma Tong recorded that the 6,781,500 Sunni Hui in China followed 58.2% Gedimu, 21% Yihewani, 10.9% Jahriyya, 7.2% Khuffiya, 1.4% Qadariyya, and 0.7% Kubrawiyya Sufi schools.

Among the northern Hui, Central Asian Sufi schools such as Kubrawiyya, Qadiriyya, and Naqshbandiyya (Khufiyya and Jahriyya) were strong influences, mostly of the Hanafi Madhhab.

With the exception of Sailaifengye, which heavily influenced by Salafi, most branches of Hui Muslims have a long tradition of synthesizing Confucian teachings with Qur'anic teachings and reportedly have contributed to Confucianism from the Tang period on. Before the "Yihewani" movement, a Chinese Muslim sect inspired by the Middle Eastern reform movement, northern Hui Sufis blended Taoist teachings and martial arts practices with Sufi philosophy.

=== Kaifeng Jews ===
Many Jews in China, for example the Kaifeng Jews, and in particular the Jewish Zhang family Zhang of Kaifeng at the start of the 20th century, converted to Islam and became Hui people.

=== Converted Han ===
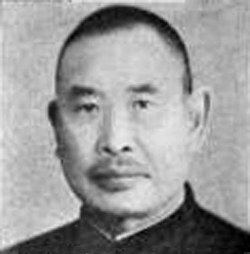
Ma Hetian

According to legend, a Muhuyindeni person converted an entire village of Han with the surname Zhang to Islam. Hui also adopted Han children and raised them as Hui. Hui in Gansu with the surnames Tang (唐) and Wang (汪) descended from Han Chinese who converted to Islam and married Muslim Hui or Dongxiangs, joining the Hui and Dongxiang ethnic groups, both Muslim. Tangwangchuan and Hanjiaji were notable as towns with a multi-ethnic community, with both non-Muslims and Muslims.

Kuomintang official Ma Hetian visited Tangwangchuan and met an "elderly local literatus from the Tang clan" while he was on his inspection tour of Gansu and Qinghai.

In Gansu province in the 1800s, a Muslim Hui woman married into the Han Chinese Kong lineage of Dachuan District, which was descended from Confucius. The Han Chinese groom and his family converted to Islam after the marriage. In 1715 in Yunnan province, a few Han Chinese descendants of Confucius also surnamed Kong married Hui women and converted to Islam.

Around 1376 the 30-year-old Chinese merchant Lin Nu visited Ormuz in Persia, converted to Islam, and married a Semu girl ("娶色目女") (either Persian or Arab) and brought her back to Quanzhou in Fujian. The Confucian philosopher Li Zhi was their descendant.

=== Mosques ===
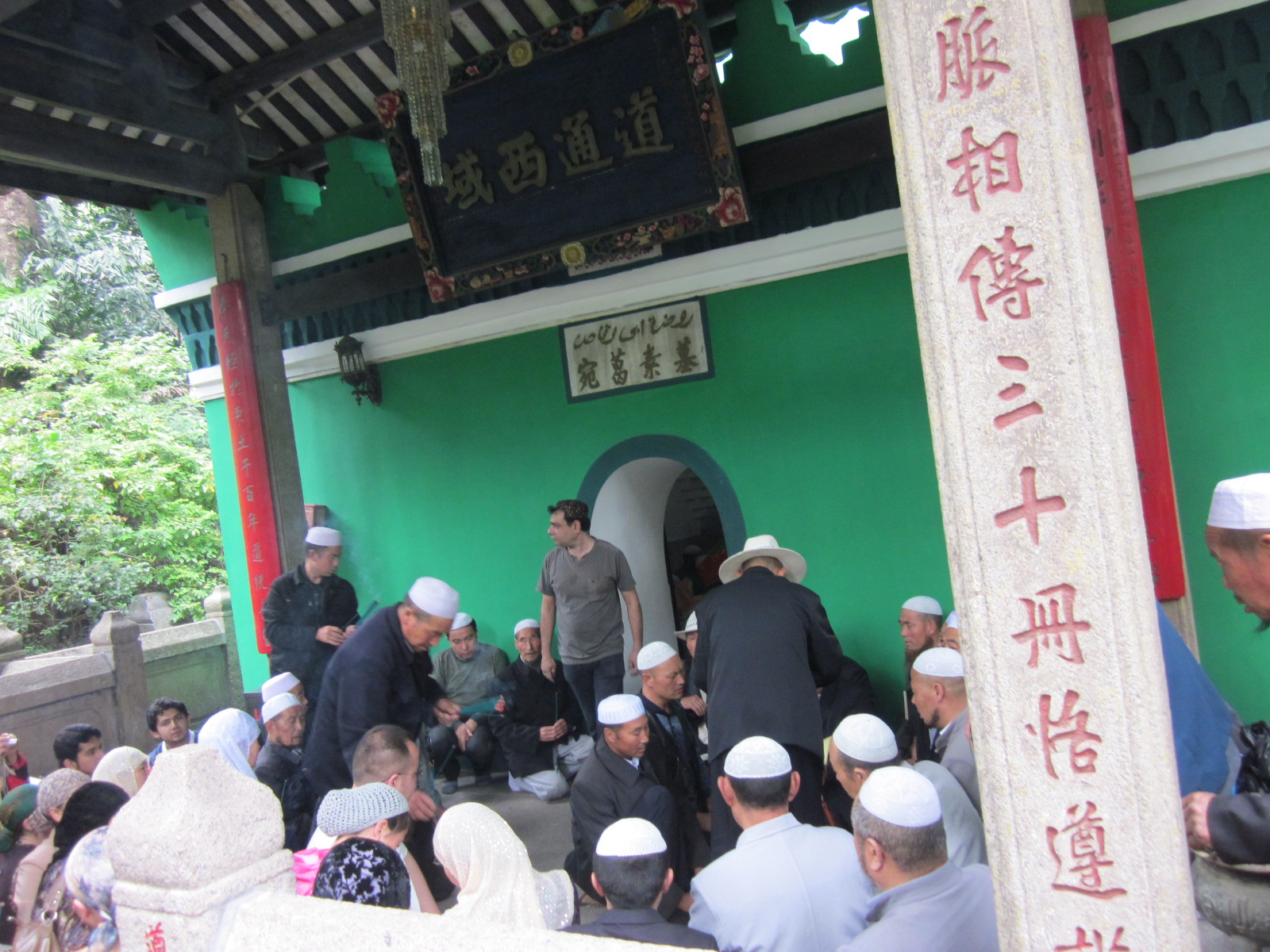
The Xianxian Mosque in Guangzhou

The style of architecture of Hui mosques varies according to their sect. The traditionalist Gedimu Hanafi Sunnis, influenced by Chinese culture, build mosques which look like Chinese temples. The reformist modernist Yihewani, originally inspired by Salafism, build their mosques in a middle-eastern style.

=== Foot binding ===
Hui women once practiced foot binding, at the time a common practice across China. It was particularly prevalent in Gansu. The Dungan people, descendants of Hui from northwestern China who fled to Central Asia, also practised foot binding until 1948. However, in southern China, in Canton, James Legge encountered a mosque that had a placard denouncing footbinding, saying Islam did not allow it because it violated God's creation.

=== Cultural practices ===
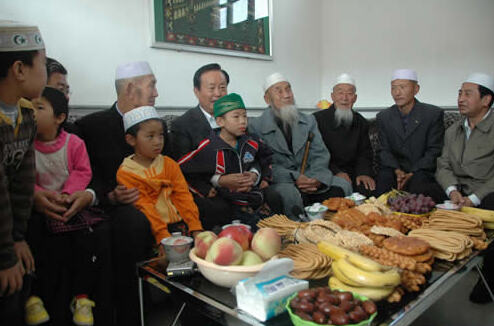
An ethnic Hui family celebrating Eid ul-Fitr in Ningxia.

French army Commandant Viscount D'Ollone reported in 1910 that Sichuanese Hui did not strictly enforce the Islamic practices of teetotaling, ritual washing and Friday prayers. Chinese practices like incense burning at ancestral tablets and honoring Confucius were adopted. One practice that was stringently observed was the ban on pork consumption.

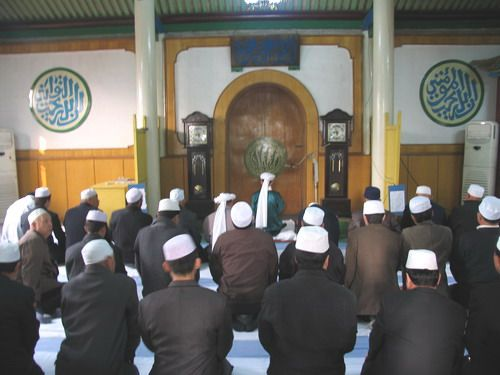
Hui men praying in a mosque

The Hui were also called ''white-capped Huihui,'' whereas the Salar were also called ''black-capped Huihui.'' The Hui followed the Han Chinese practice of burning incense during worship, while the Salar denounced this practice as a heathen ritual. The Sunni Gedimu and the Yihewani burned incense during worship. This was viewed as Daoist or Buddhist influence.

In Yunnan province, during the Qing dynasty, tablets that wished the Emperor a long life were placed at mosque entrances. No minarets were available and no chanting accompanied the call to prayer. The mosques were similar to Buddhist temples, and incense was burned inside.

Hui enlisted in the military and were praised for their martial skills.

Circumcision in Islam is known as khitan. Islamic scholars agree that it is required (mandatory), or recommended. However, circumcision is not universally practiced among the Hui. In the regions where it is undertaken, Hui tradition is that the maternal uncle (Jiujiu) play an important role by the circumcision and wedding of his nephew.

=== Names ===
The long history of Hui residence and mixing in China has led the Hui to adopt names typical of their Han neighbors; however, some common Hui names are actually Chinese renderings of common Muslim (i.e. Arabic) and Persian names. For instance, surname "Ma" for "Muhammad".

Hui people usually have a Chinese name and a Muslim name in Arabic, although the Chinese name is used primarily. Some Hui do not remember their Muslim names.

Hui people who adopt foreign names may not use their Muslim names. An example of this is Pai Hsien-yung, a Hui author in America, who adopted the name Kenneth. His father was Muslim general Bai Chongxi, who had his children adopt western names.

==== Surnames ====
Hui people commonly believe that their surnames originated as "Sinified" forms of their foreign Muslim ancestors some time during the Yuan or Ming eras. Common Hui surnames:

- Ma for Muhammad
- Mu for Muhammad
- Han
- Ha for Hasan
- Hu for Hussein
- Sai for Sa'id
- Sha for Shah
- Zheng for Shams
- Guo (Koay) for Kamaruddin
- Cai (Chuah) for Osman
- Hai for Haydar

A Ningxia legend states that four common Hui surnames—Na, Su, La, and Ding—originate with the descendants of Nasruddin, a son of Sayyid Ajjal Shams al-Din Omar, who "divided" the ancestor's name (Nasulading, in Chinese) among themselves.

=== Literature ===
The Han Kitab is a collection of Islamic and Confucian texts written by various Hui authors in the 18th century, including Liu Zhi. New works were written by Hui intellectuals following education reform by Ma Clique warlords and Bai Chongxi. Some texts were translated from Arabic.

A new edition of a book by Ma Te-hsin, called Ho-yin Ma Fu-ch'u hsien-sheng i-shu Ta hua tsung kuei Ssu tien yaohui, first printed in 1865, was reprinted in 1927 by Ma Fuxiang. General Ma Fuxiang invested in new editions of Confucian and Islamic texts. He edited Shuofang Daozhi, a gazette and books such as Meng Cang ZhuangKuang: Hui Bu Xinjiang fu.

=== Language ===
The Hui of Yunnan, whom the Burmese called Panthays, were reportedly fluent in Arabic. During the Panthay Rebellion, Arabic replaced Chinese as the official language of the rebelling Pingnan Kingdom.

Published in 1844, The Chinese repository, Volume 13 includes an account of an Englishman who stayed in the Chinese city of Ningbo, where he visited the local mosque. The Hui running the mosque was from Shandong and descended from residents of Medina. He was able to read and speak Arabic with ease, but was illiterate in Chinese, although he was born in China and spoke Chinese.

=== Marriage ===
Hui marriages resemble typical Chinese marriages except that traditional Chinese rituals are not used. Endogamy is practiced by Hui, who mainly marry amongst themselves rather than with Muslims from other sects. However, the Hui Na family in Ningxia is known to practice both parallel and cross cousin marriage. The Najiahu village in Ningxia is named after this family, descended from Sayyid Ajjal Shams al-Din Omar.

Intermarriage generally involves a Han Chinese converting to Islam when marrying a Hui, and marriage without conversion only takes place rarely. In Hui discourse, marriage between a Hui woman and a Han man is not allowed unless the Han converts to Islam, although it occurred repeatedly in Eastern China. Generally Han of both sexes have to convert to Islam before marrying. This practice helped increase the population of Hui. A case of switching nationality occurred in 1972 when a Han man married a Hui and was considered a Hui after converting.

Zhao nuxu is a practice where the son-in-law moves in with the wife's family. Some marriages between Han and Hui are conducted this way. The husband does not need to convert, but the wife's family follows Islamic customs. No census data documents this type of marriage, reporting only cases in which the wife moves in with the groom's family. In Henan province, a marriage was recorded between a Han boy and Hui girl without the Han converting, during the Ming dynasty. Steles in Han and Hui villages record this story and Hui and Han members of the Lineage celebrate at the ancestral temple together.

In Beijing, Oxen street Gladney found 37 Han–Hui couples; two of which were had Hui wives and the other 35 had Hui husbands. Data was collected in different Beijing districts. In Ma Dian 20% of intermarriages were Hui women marrying into Han families, in Tang Fang 11% of intermarriage were Hui women marrying into Han families. 67.3% of intermarriage in Tang Fang were Han women marrying into a Hui family and in Ma Dian 80% of intermarriage were Han women marrying into Hui families.

Li Nu, the son of Li Lu, from a Han Chinese Li family in Quanzhou visited Hormuz in Persia in 1376. He married a Persian or an Arab girl, and brought her back to Quanzhou. He then converted to Islam. Li Nu was the ancestor of Ming dynasty reformer Li Chih.

In Gansu province in the 1800s, a Muslim Hui woman married into the Han Chinese Kong lineage of Dachuan, which was descended from Confucius. The Han Chinese groom and his family were only converted to Islam after the marriage by their Muslim relatives. In 1715 in Yunnan province, few Han Chinese married Hui women and converted to Islam.

Jiang Xingzhou, a Han bannerman lieutenant from the Bordered Yellow Banner, married a Muslim woman in Mukden during Qianlong's late reign. He fled his position due to fear of being punished for being a bannerman marrying a commoner woman. He was sentenced to death for leaving his official post but the sentence was commuted and he was not executed.

In the Dungan Revolt (1895–96) 400 Muslims in Topa 多巴 did not join the revolt and proclaimed their loyalty to China. An argument between a Han Chinese and his Muslim wife led to these Muslims getting massacred, when she threatened that the Muslims from Topa would attack Tankar and give a signal to their co-religionists to rise up and open the gates by burning the temples atop the hills. The husband reported this to an official and the next day the Muslims were massacred with the exception of a few Muslim girls who were married off to Han Chinese.

In the 21st century, Hui men marrying Han women and Han men who marry Hui women have above average education.

=== Education ===
Hui have supported modern education and reform. Hui such as Hu Songshan and the Ma Clique warlords promoted western, modern secular education. Elite Hui received both Muslim and Confucian education. They studied the Quran and Confucian texts like the Spring and Autumn Annals. Hui people refused to follow the May Fourth Movement. Instead, they taught both western subjects such as science along with traditional Confucian literature and classical Chinese, along with Islamic education and Arabic. Hui warlord Ma Bufang built a girls' school in Linxia that taught modern secular subjects. Hui have had female imams, called Nu Ahong for centuries. They are the world's only female Imams. They guide women in prayer but are not allowed to lead prayers.

=== Increasing religiosity in China ===
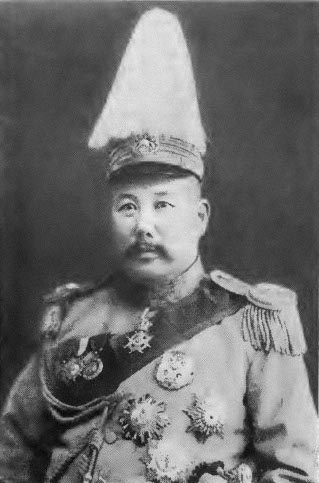
Ma Fuxiang

According to Dru Gladney, professor at Pomona College in California and a leading scholar on the Hui people, Hui Muslims are enjoying a resurgence in religiosity in China, and that the number of practising Muslims among the Hui people, are rising as well as a "dramatic increase" in the number of Hui women wearing the Hijab, and the numbers of Hui going on the Haj. There are also estimated twice as many mosques in China today than there were in 1950, in which majority were built by Hui Muslims.

One of the reasons for the trend in China, is that Hui Muslims play a vital role as being middlemen in trade between the Middle East and China, and the China-Middle East trade has become increasingly important to the country. Consequently, the government has started constructing a $3.7 billion Islamic theme park called "World Muslim City", in Yinchuan, one of Hui Muslims hubs. Additionally unlike Uyghurs, who faces far more restrictions in religious freedoms, Hui Muslims generally do not seek independence from China and have a cultural affinity to the Han, and are far more assimilated into mainstream Chinese life. "It's not an issue of freedom of religion," says Gladney, "Clearly, there are many avenues of religious expression that are unfettered in China, but when you cross these very often nebulous and shifting boundaries of what the state regards as political, then you're in dangerous territory. Obviously this is what we see in Xinjiang and in Tibet".

== Outside mainland China ==
In Southeast Asia, presence of Hui Muslims may date back 700 years to the time of Zheng He, who was a Hui. Hui people also joined the wave of Chinese migrants that peaked between 1875 and 1912. They inhabited Penang, Sabah, Singapore and Pangkor prior to World War II. Most were Hokkien-speaking coolies and merchants from Fujian. The colonial British welfare system was commissioned according to language groups, so the Hui were classed as Hokkien. A small number of Hui may have become assimilated into mainstream Chinese society and local Muslim populations. In 1975, five Hui leaders started a campaign to get every clansman to put up a notice listing their ancestors for 40 generations, as a way of reminding them of their origins. The exact Hui population is unclear today as many families left Islam before independence. In 2000 official census figures gave the number of Muslim Chinese in Malaysia as 57,000 but most were Han converts. According to the Malaysian Chinese Muslim Association, the surnames Koay, Ma, Ha, Ta, Sha, Woon, and An (or Ang) may indicate Hui ancestry.

Saudi Arabia was settled by hundreds of Hui Muslim soldiers under Ma Chengxiang after 1949. The Hui General Ma Bufang settled permanently in Mecca in 1961. For a while Cairo was the dwelling place of Ma Bukang and Ma Bufang in between the time they were in Saudi Arabia. The death of Ma Jiyuan in Jeddah on 27 February 2012 was greeted with sorrow by the Chinese consulate.

The Panthays in Myanmar and some of the Chin Haw in Thailand are Hui Muslims, while Hui in Central Asia and Russia are called Dungans.

== Notable Hui people ==
=== Historical figures and Islamic scholars ===
- Zheng He — Ming admiral, diplomat and explorer from a Hui Muslim family, best known for his treasure voyages.
- Isa Ma — Hui Chinese Muslim educator, writer, speaker, da'i and Islamic content creator.
- Fei Xin — Ming Muslim interpreter and author who accompanied Zheng He's voyages.
- Ma Huan — Hui Muslim interpreter and chronicler who accompanied Zheng He on several voyages.
- Nasr al-Din (Yunnan) — Yuan Muslim official associated with the early history of the Hui.
- Wang Jinghong — Ming court eunuch and naval commander who served alongside Zheng He.
- Mu Ying — Ming general of Hui ancestry and major military figure in Yunnan.
- Hu Dahai — Ming military commander of Hui ancestry.
- Wang Daiyu — Qing-era Islamic scholar and foundational Han Kitab thinker.
- Ma Zhu — Hui Islamic scholar and important Han Kitab author.
- Liu Zhi — Hui Islamic scholar and prominent Han Kitab writer.
- Yusuf Ma Dexin — Hui Islamic scholar, theologian and translator of Islamic texts.
- Muhammad Ma Jian — Hui Islamic scholar and translator of the Qur'an.
- Wang Jingzhai — Hui Islamic scholar and translator of the Qur'an.
- Ma Laichi — Hui Sufi scholar and founder of the Khufiyya tradition in China.
- Ma Mingxin — Hui Sufi scholar and founder of the Jahriyya tradition in China.
- Qi Jingyi — Hui Sufi scholar and religious leader.
- Ma Qixi — Hui Sufi scholar and founder of the Xidaotang tradition.
- Ma Yuanzhang — Hui Sufi scholar and leader of the Jahriyya tradition.
- Ma Shenglin — Hui Jahriyya Sufi leader.
- Hu Songshan — Hui imam and Islamic reformer.
- Noor Deen Mi Guangjiang — Hui Muslim calligrapher known for Arabic and Islamic calligraphy.
- Bai Shouyi — Hui historian specializing in Chinese and Islamic history.
- Huo Da — Hui novelist whose works explore Hui Muslim life in China.
- Zhang Chengzhi — Hui Chinese novelist and essayist known for works concerning Hui and Islamic identity.
- Ma Ruifang — Hui Chinese novelist and scholar.

=== Military and political figures ===
- Bai Yanhu — Hui military commander who led Hui forces during the Dungan Revolt.
- Bai Chongxi — Hui Muslim general and prominent Nationalist military commander.
- Bai Lichen — Hui politician and former chairman of the Ningxia Hui Autonomous Region.
- Du Wenxiu — Hui Muslim leader of the Panthay Rebellion and ruler of the Dali Sultanate.
- Hui Liangyu — Hui politician who served as Vice Premier of China.
- Liu Geping — Hui Muslim communist revolutionary and founding chairman of the Ningxia Hui Autonomous Region.
- Liu Hui — Hui politician who served as chairwoman of the Ningxia Hui Autonomous Region.
- Yang Jingren — Hui communist politician and prominent official responsible for ethnic and religious affairs.
- Wang Zhengwei — Hui politician and former chairman of the Ningxia Hui Autonomous Region.
- Xian Hui — Hui politician who served as chairman of the Ningxia Hui Autonomous Region.
- Shi Zongyuan — Hui politician and former Party Secretary of Guizhou.
- Wang Fuyu — Hui politician and former senior provincial official.
- Ma Anliang — Hui Muslim Qing and Republican-era general.
- Ma Buqing — Hui Muslim general and member of the Ma clique.
- Ma Biao — Hui Muslim general who fought the Japanese.
- Ma Fulu — Hui Muslim Qing general who fought during the Boxer Rebellion.
- Ma Fuxiang — Hui Muslim general and politician.
- Ma Fuyuan — Hui Muslim Ma clique general and military commander.
- Ma Hualong — Hui Muslim Sufi leader and major leader of the Dungan Revolt.
- Ma Hongbin — Hui Muslim general and former governor of Ningxia.
- Ma Hongkui — Hui Muslim general and former governor of Ningxia.
- Ma Hushan — Hui Muslim warlord in Xinjiang.
- Ma Lin — Hui Muslim general and governor of Qinghai.
- Ma Qi — Hui Muslim general and governor of Qinghai.
- Ma Shaowu — Hui Muslim general and governor of Kashgar.
- Ma Zhan'ao — Hui Muslim Qing general.
- Ma Zhancang — Hui Muslim general in Xinjiang.
- Ma Zhanshan — Hui general and anti-Japanese military commander.
- Ma Zhongying — Hui Muslim warlord who commanded forces in Xinjiang.

=== Writers, historians and artists ===
- Bai Shouyi — Hui historian specializing in Chinese and Islamic history.
- Huo Da — Hui novelist whose works explore Hui Muslim life in China.
- Zhang Chengzhi — Hui Chinese novelist and essayist.
- Ma Ruifang — Hui Chinese novelist and scholar.
- Iasyr Shivaza — Dungan poet and writer.
- Zhang Hongtu — Hui Chinese-American artist.
- Zhao Yannian — Hui Chinese artist and illustrator.
- Gai Qi — Hui painter and poet of the Qing dynasty.

=== Martial artists ===
- Chang Dongsheng — Hui Chinese martial artist and pioneer of Chinese Sanda.
- Ma Xianda — Hui Chinese Wushu master and teacher.
- Wang Ziping — Hui Muslim martial artist and practitioner of traditional Chinese medicine.
- Wang Zhengyi — Hui Muslim martial artist of the late Qing dynasty.
- Wang Jurong — Hui Muslim martial artist and Wushu professor.
- Helen Wu — Chinese Muslim martial artist, Wushu teacher and daughter of Wang Jurong.

== See also ==
- Chinese Muslims in the Second Sino-Japanese War
- Dungan people
- Hui Minorities' War
- Hui pan-nationalism
- Hui people in Beijing
