= Ma Ching-chiang =

Chinese Muslim general

- Military career
- Allegiance: Republic of China
- Service years: 1970s
- Rank: Lt. General
- Commands: General in the Republic of China Army

Ma Ching-chiang (Xiao'erjing: ﻣَﺎ دٍ ﺛِﯿْﺎ, December 8, 1912 – 1993 (aged 80–81)) was a Chinese Muslim general of the Republic of China Army, who served in the 1970s. He served as Deputy Commander-in-Chief of the Combined Service Forces and an advisor of President Chiang Kai-shek.
