= Chaquan =

Chinese martial art

Chaquan 查拳
- Also known as: Chuan Na Cha Quan, Chuan Na Quan, Cha Fist
- Focus: Striking, weapons training
- Country of origin: China
- Creator: Sha Da Chuan (attributed as founder); Xiu Yiqian (developed the art)
- Famous practitioners: Wang Ziping; Zhang Wenguang; Ma Jinbiao; Liu Hongchi
- Parenthood: Tai chi Yuan Gong
- Olympic sport: Wushu (sport)

Chaquan (Chinese: 查拳; pinyin: Chāquán) is a Chinese martial art that features graceful movements and some acrobatic aerial maneuvers and includes a large range of weapons. Chaquan falls under the classification Changquan, a type of Northern Chinese martial arts known for their extended, long movements. (Note: In other contexts, Changquan can refer to the first form of many martial arts.)

The style is associated with the Hui people and related to the Turkic people from Central Asia. In the legend, a Turkic warrior named "Zha Mi-Er" (maybe Sameer [name of Arabic origin] or Dämir [meaning "iron" in Turkic]); Chinese: 查密爾) from current Xinjiang or Central Asia passed down this martial art to the Chinese locals in the current Xandong province during the late Ming dynasty. One famous master of Chaquan was Wang Ziping, who was known for his great strength. Other modern day masters include Zhang Wenguang, Ma Jinbiao, and Liu Hongchi.

Chaquan is one of the sources of the contemporary Wushu Changquan, which is often seen in movies and tournaments.

Chaquan is a system that has six main weapons (staff, saber, sword, spear, kwandao, hookswords). It emphasizes long range movements and stances combined with speed and power. The style includes many forms, including 10 lines of tantui for basic power training, 10 longer sets of Chaquan, and other forms as well.
