= Du Fengyang =

Chinese rebel commander

Du Fengyang (1849–1870), was a Chinese rebel commander. She was the daughter of Du Wenxiu and served first as a soldier in the army of her father and then as the commander of her own army during the Panthay rebellion in 1867–70. She was eventually defeated and executed.
