= Ma Ruifang =

Chinese author, scholar and professor

- 马瑞芳 / ﻣَﺎ ژُﻮِ ﻓْﺎ
- Born: 1942 (age 83–84); Qingzhou, Shandong, Republic of China
- Education: Shandong University
- Occupations: Author, scholar, professor
- Years active: 1978–present
- Known for: literature of Pu Songling in the CCTV-10 program Lecture Room
- Television: Lecture Room
- Spouse: Niu Yunqing (牛运清)
- Parent: Ma Chuzhen (马楚珍)
- Relatives: Ma Defu (马德甫; grandpa)

Ma Ruifang (simplified Chinese: 马瑞芳; traditional Chinese: 馬瑞芳; pinyin: Mǎ Ruìfāng, Xiao'erjing: ﻣَﺎ ژُﻮِ ﻓْﺎ; born 1942) is a Chinese author, scholar and professor at the School of Literature, Shandong University.

== Biography ==
Ma was born in 1942 in Qingzhou, Shandong. Her grandfather Ma Defu (马德甫) and father Ma Chuzhen (马楚珍) were doctors. She belonged to the Hui ethnic group. Her mother was educated. Ma read books in Yidu County Library (益都县图书馆) when she studied at primary school. She was accepted into Shandong University and graduated in 1965. In 1966, Mao Zedong launched the Cultural revolution and she was persecuted. In 1980, Ma started to study the literature of Pu Songling.

Ma became popular in China for her lectures on literature of Pu Songling in the CCTV-10 program Lecture Room in 2005.
