= Wang Ziping =

Chinese martial artist

- Born: 1881; Cangzhou, Hebei, Qing China
- Died: 1973 (aged 91–92); Illness
- Native name: 王子平
- Nationality: Chinese
- Style: Wushu: Chaquan, Huaquan, Paoquan, Bajiquan, Tai chi
- Teachers: Chaquan: Yang Hongxiu
- Rank: Grandmaster

Other information
- Notable relatives: Wang Jurong (daughter)

Wang Ziping
- Traditional Chinese: 王子平
- Simplified Chinese: 王子平
Transcriptions
Standard Mandarin
- Hanyu Pinyin: Wáng Zǐpíng
- Wade–Giles: Wang Tzŭ-p’ing

Wang Ziping (1881–1973, Xiao'erjing: وْا ذِ پٍ) was a Chinese Muslim practitioner of Chinese Martial Arts and traditional medicine from Cangzhou, Cangxian county, Mengcun, Hebei Province. He served as the leader of the Shaolin kung fu division of the Martial Arts Institute in 1928 and was also the vice chairman of the Chinese Wushu Association. Wang was known for his mastery of Chaquan, Huaquan, Paoquan, Bajiquan, and tai chi. He was also a master of Wushu.

== Biography ==
Early in his life, Wang fought in the Boxer Rebellion against the foreign Western and Japanese imperialist Eight-Nation Alliance. This was believed to have resulted from the fact that Ziping had lived most of his life with China under imperialist pressure from major European powers. Some accounts say he was forced into exile from his home after the end of the Boxer Rebellion and suppression of the Boxers, and became a student of Yang Hongxiu, from whom he learned the art of Chaquan.

Wang won many fights against Russian, American, German, and Japanese martial artists.

Wang defeated a German officer's challenge in a weight lifting contest at Jiaoji. When the Germans wanted to take the antique doors of the Qinzhou mosque for themselves, Wang Ziping guarded the doors so the Germans challenged him to another weight lifting contest. When Wang triumphed over their challenge, the Germans left.

Wang and Zhu Guofu defended martial arts historian Tang Hao (Tang Fansheng) from opponents who were angered by his work "Shaolin-Wudang Kao" which refuted the story of Bodhidharma and Zhang Sanfeng as being the creators of Shaolin and tai chi.

Liu Jin Sheng, who authored "Chin Na Methods" along with Zhao Jiang, was a student of Wang.

He developed an exercise regime for long life. He published works on martial arts exercises.

At the sixth National Games, Wang served as a judge for martial arts and wrestling. When Zhou Enlai visited Burma, Wang, then 80 years old, went with his delegation, performing martial arts during the visit. He died when he was 93 years old.

Wang developed "Quan Shr Er Shr Fa" (Twenty Fist Method) as well as "Ching Long Jian" (Green Dragon Sword).

== Family ==
He was succeeded by his only daughter Wang Jurong, and his three granddaughters through her are Grace X. Wu, Helen Wu, and Wu Xiaoping.
