= Bai Shouyi =

Chinese scholar and activist

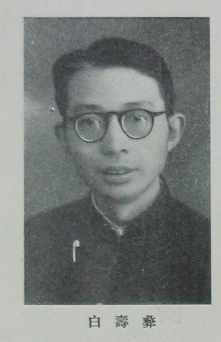
Bai Shouyi

Bai Shouyi (simplified Chinese: 白寿彝; traditional Chinese: 白壽彝; pinyin: Bái Shòuyí; February 1909 – March 21, 2000), also known as Djamal al-Din Bai Shouyi, was a Chinese ethnologist, historian, social activist, and writer who revolutionized Chinese historiography.

== Biography ==
Born a son of a Hui merchant in Kaifeng, Henan, he became literate in Arabic from his mother and aunt.He died in Beijing at the age of 91.

== Views and opinions ==
Bai was a Marxist whose studies take a class-centric view and reasoning. He argued for the need for increased awareness of Islam and Muslims by the Chinese population since Muslims numbered 50 million in China alone and Western works were the only ones available for non-Muslim Chinese to study Muslims living right with them in China. He said Muslims in Western China could either stand as a "defensive wall" or "hinder ...national defence", depending on whether conduct to them was good or bad.

== Published works ==
- Bai Shouyi et al. (2003). A History of Chinese Muslim. Beijing: Zhonghua Book Company. ISBN 7-101-02890-X. Cover page.

== See also ==
- Chinese history
- Marxist history
