= Du Wenxiu =

Chinese Muslim rebel leader (1823–1872)

- Qa'id jami al-muslimin Generalissimo
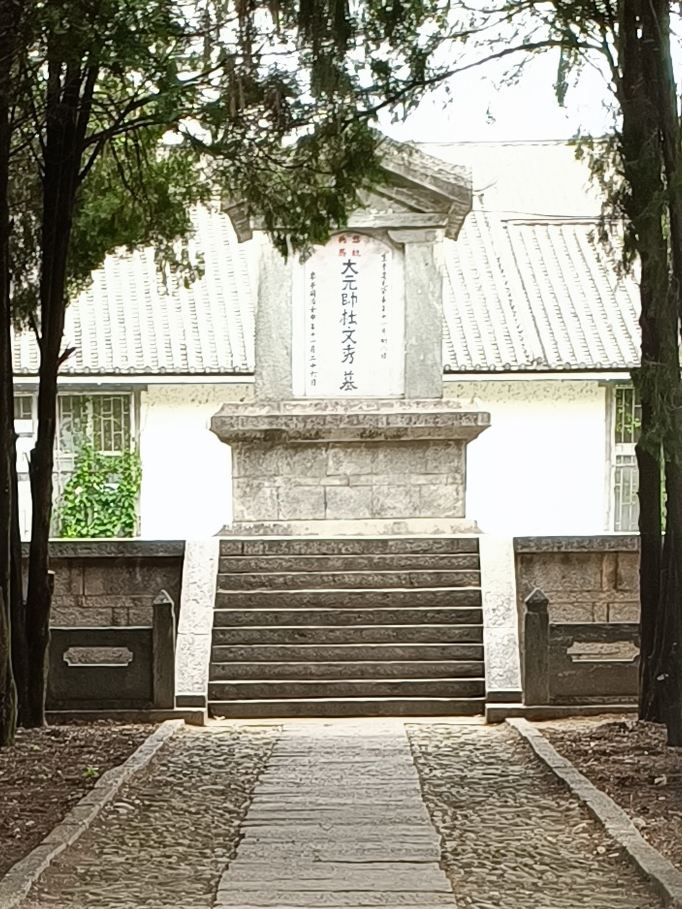
- Tomb of Du Wenxiu in 2022

Sultan of Pingnan Guo (Dali)
- Reign: 23 October 1856 – 26 December 1872
- Predecessor: Position established
- Successor: Position abolished
- Born: 1823; Yongchang, Qing Dynasty
- Died: 1872 (aged 48–49); Dali, Qing Dynasty
- Issue: Du Fengyang
- Religion: Sunni Islam

Du Wenxiu
- Chinese: 杜文秀
Transcriptions
Standard Mandarin
- Hanyu Pinyin: Dù Wénxiù
- Wade–Giles: Tu Wen-hsiu

Sulaiman Du Wenxiu (Chinese: 杜文秀; pinyin: Dù Wénxiù; Wade–Giles: Tu Wen-hsiu, Xiao'erjing: ٔدُﻮْ وٌ ﺷِﯿَﻮْ ْ; 1823 – 1872) was the Chinese Muslim leader of the Panthay Rebellion, an anti-Qing revolt in China during the Qing dynasty. Du Wenxiu was ethnically Han from both his parents and not Hui but was raised as a Muslim and led his rebellion as an anti-Manchu rebellion.

== Early life and background ==
Born in Yongchang (now Baoshan, Yunnan), Du Wenxiu was the son of a Muslim Hui. His original name was Yang Xiu (杨秀). Du was educated in the Chinese classics and like the sons of other elite Hui families; studied for the Chinese civil service exams. At the age of sixteen he passed the first exam; obtaining his xiucai degree. He became respected among Yunnanese Hui when he and two others travelled to Beijing and petitioned the imperial court for compensation for the 1845 Baoshan Massacre of the Hui. After he failed to secure a settlement from the Qing administration, Du traveled through western Yunnan's trading networks on behalf of his family. The experience of his travels made him conscious of the commercial, political, and multiethnic landscape of Yunnan.

The rebellion started after massacres of Hui perpetrated by the Qing authorities. Du used anti-Manchu rhetoric in his rebellion against the Qing, calling for Han to join the Hui to overthrow the Manchu-led Qing dynasty after 200 years of their rule.

Du invited the fellow Hui Muslim leader Ma Rulong to join him in driving the Manchus out and "recover China". For his war against Manchu "oppression", Du "became a Muslim hero", while Ma Rulong defected to the Qing. On multiple occasions Kunming was attacked and sacked by Du Wenxiu's forces. He was the father of Du Fengyang, who also participated in the rebellion.

Ma Shilin, a descendant of Ma Mingxin joined the Panthay rebels as a garrison commander and civil official, meeting his end at the fortress of Donggouzhai after a year-long Qing siege.

== Relationship with Ma Rulong ==
In Kunming, there was a slaughter of 3,000 Muslims on the instigation of the judicial commissioner, who was a Manchu, in 1856. Du Wenxiu was of Han Chinese origin despite being a Muslim and he led both Hui Muslims and Han Chinese in his civil and military bureaucracy. Du Wenxiu was fought against by another Hui leader who defected to the Qing dynasty, Ma Rulong. Ma claimed that the central government was not responsible for the massacres of the Yunnanese Hui & that the blame lay with corrupt local officials. He tried to convince Du Wenxiu to lay down his arms and make peace as all Muslims were one family. Du responded to Ma's letter In less than a week; categorically refuting his claims & pointed out that Ma's defection was the reason Muslims had become divided. In a memorial, Du asked Ma Dexin to intervene so that Ma Rulong would end the criminal act "of killing his fellow Muslims (tongjiao)"

== Relationship with Ma Dexin ==
Ma Dexin was the most prominent Hui scholar in Yunnan. He used his prestige to act as a mediator between the different Hui factions & "helped orient and validate" the rebellion throughout the province. He was respected by both Du Wenxiu & Ma Rulong as a spiritual leader. In 1860; Ma Dexin sent forces to help Du Wenxiu fight the Qing; assuring him that:

"I have already secretly ordered my disciples [mensheng] Ma [Rulong] as the Grand Commander of Three Directions, with Ma Rong as second in command . . . to launch a rearguard attack from their base in Yimen."

There is evidence that Ma Dexin, Ma Rulong & the Hui forces with them only pretended to surrender (in 1862) in order to gain access to the city of Kunming. Even after their supposed capitulation to the Qing; Ma Rulong continued to issue proclamations using his seal "Generalissimo of the Three Directions" while Ma Dexin refused to accept the Civil title granted to him; not wanting to be associated with the Qing regime. The Hui rebels taunted the Hui who hadn't joined the rebellion as being fake Hui (jia Huizi). Taiwanese researcher Li Shoukong asserts that in responding to the Qing offer for surrender; Ma Rulong acted hastily with no plan or thought other than to gain access to the Walled city of Kunming. Many Hui rebels had employed a similar tactic in the early years of the rebellion.

To test his loyalty Ma Rulong was sent to pacify the disgruntled magistrate of Lin'an (in Southern Yunnan). A few weeks after Ma Rulong left the city; rebel forces led by Ma Rong and Ma Liansheng stormed Kunming & captured it. Ma Rulong's forces had come to believe that he could no longer be trusted to achieve their goal of uniting under a single rebel government. Seeking to join Du Wenxiu and unite in opposition to the Qing; the Hui raised the white banner of the Pingnan State, dropped regional references and began to refer to themselves from this point on as Muslims. In 1863 Ma Dexin declared himself "King-Who-Pacifies-the-South (Pingnan Wang)", seized the official seals & stopped using the Qing reign year when dating documents. Ma Dexin hoped to keep the rebel forces united under him until he could hand over control to Du Wenxiu.

Ma Rulong immediately rushed back to Kunming, He was rebuked by his followers who told him that "If you only crave to be an official with no thought for your fellow Muslims, you should return to [your home in] Guanyi." Ma Rulong attacked the city along with Qing forces; ordered Ma Dexin to give up his seals of office & placed him under house arrest. Ma Dexin also opposed Ma Rulong's acceptance of the Qing policy of "using Hui to fight other Hui".

Ma Dexin was sent to convince Du Wenxiu to surrender in 1864. He was sympathetic to Du's cause but saw no point in continuing to resist anymore. He told Du that the Hui must not fall into the trap of the Qing & that with the end of the Taipeng rebellion the Qing would bring their full force to bear to crush the Hui. Du refused to surrender instead he offered Ma Dexin a position in his government.

== Policies of Du Wenxiu's Dali sultanate ==
After the Hui rebels took control of Dali, Du Wenxiu was proclaimed as their generalissimo on 23 October 1856, he then ordered the repairing of the city's main mosque & the construction of 5 new mosques. To revitalize Islamic education in Yunnan Du Wenxiu established Islamic Madrassas, promoted the use of the Arabic language among the Hui & printed the first copy of the Quran in China.

The Sultanate's bureaucracy employed Arabic as the preferred language for communication among the Hui elite and the preferred language for foreign diplomatic relations. When the first British envoys arrived in Yunnan from Burma they were presented with documents entirely in Arabic and had to wait several days for it to be translated into Chinese.

Instead of wearing queues as mandated by the Qing the male subjects of Sultanate let their hair grow long. And the Qing referred to the rebels as "long-haired rebels (changfa Huijei)". The Dali regime used White Banners.

Du Wenxiu's seal; On one side was his Chinese title of generalissimo (zongtong bingma dayuanshuai) and on the other his Islamic titles of Sultan and Commander of all the Muslims (Qa'id jami al-muslimin).

A state proclamation sent to the Muslims of Lhasa in the early 1860s (by way of Hui caravan traders) justified the rebellion as a righteous response to treachery by idolaters. The declaration was written in Arabic and was filled with Qur'anic and Islamic metaphors. It described the Pingnan rebellion using Islamic terminology:

"The cause of the dispute was that the Idolaters and their chiefs assembled together to kill the Muslims and began to insult their religion.... Having abandoned every hope of life, we fought with the Idolaters and God gave us the victory.... [The ruler's] name is Sadik, otherwise called Suleiman. He has now established Islamic Law. He administers justice according to the dictates of the Qur'an and their traditions. Since we have made him our Imam we have been by the decree of God, very victorious.... The Ministers and chiefs under our Imam are as single-hearted as Abu Bakr and as bold as Ali. No one can face them in battle. They are imperious to the Infidel but meek to the Muslim. The metropolis of Infidelity has become a city of Islam!"

The Dali Sultanate used Imperial Chinese Symbols & challenged the Qing by using Ming era Imagery. Du tried to highlight the foreign nature of Manchu rule even in dress; and his own imperial robes were from the "Chinese" Ming dynasty. According to David G. Atwill: "The regime reflected the strong interethnic ties of the Hui with the Han and of the Yi with predominantly Han-Islamic imagery and a heavily indigenized presence in its institutions and rule." Du Wenxiu cited the example of the Nanzhao Kingdom, as proof for the feasibility of an Independent Yunnan based government:

"if we cannot realize far-reaching permanent victory, we can still achieve a smaller, more remote success like that of the Nanzhao Kingdom, which lasted eight hundred years".

The power of the Hui State between the years 1863-68 was described by the French missionary Father Ponsot:

"Since the Hui occupied Dali they have become consistently stronger and more or less the masters of the land. They control almost all the towns around Zhongdian, Heqing and Lijiang extending almost up to Tibet, land of the lamas."

Areas under rule of the Dali Sultanate were widely considered to be far safer and less corrupt than the areas under imperial control. European travelers observed that a "calm tranquility reigned over this country". Traders "lauded the security of the White banner [Dali-controlled] territory" and locals attributed the presence of prosperous trade to Du Wenxiu's efforts to "trade as much as possible, both by the imposition of light duties and a rigorous administration of justice." The Dali government created policies to encourage locals to protect trade caravans and ordered officials to guard the main passes into Yunnan and to provide free lodging to traders. Du Wenxiu himself set up a trading company in Burma and also established two cotton trading bureaus in Ava, one of them operated by his sister. Religious instructions called upon Yunnanese Muslims and traders to not contradict Islamic Law:

"It is not permitted to transgress [the teaching of the legal schools by] acting [out of] subjective will; to foolishly [pursue] personal benefits; to despicably chase privileges; to act eccentrically or absurdly; to embrace heterodox [thoughts]; to claim supernatural [powers]; or to boast a connection with the spirits. Nor [it is permitted] to deceive common [people, in order to] pursue profit and fame; or to falsify rites and ceremonies, and to confuse different teachings. [This would be like] disguising [metals for] gold or counterfeiting silver; [or] selling dog meat [after] labeling [it] as “sheep”; [or] exaggerating [things] in order to deceive people. For those who fall prey to confusion, the harm is hard to undo. These kinds of things compromise cleanliness and truth [qingzhen], as do a poison or a big plague."

These instructions indicate the Yunnanese Muslim concern for the preservation of Islamic Orthodoxy and their belief that Qing rule had corrupted their traditions with decadent habits and beliefs like Shamanism.

Islam, Confucianism and Tribal pagan animism were all legalized and "honoured" with a "Chinese-style bureaucracy" in Du Wenxiu's sultanate. A third of the sultanate's military posts were filled with Han Chinese, who also filled the majority of civil posts.

== Defeat and legacy ==
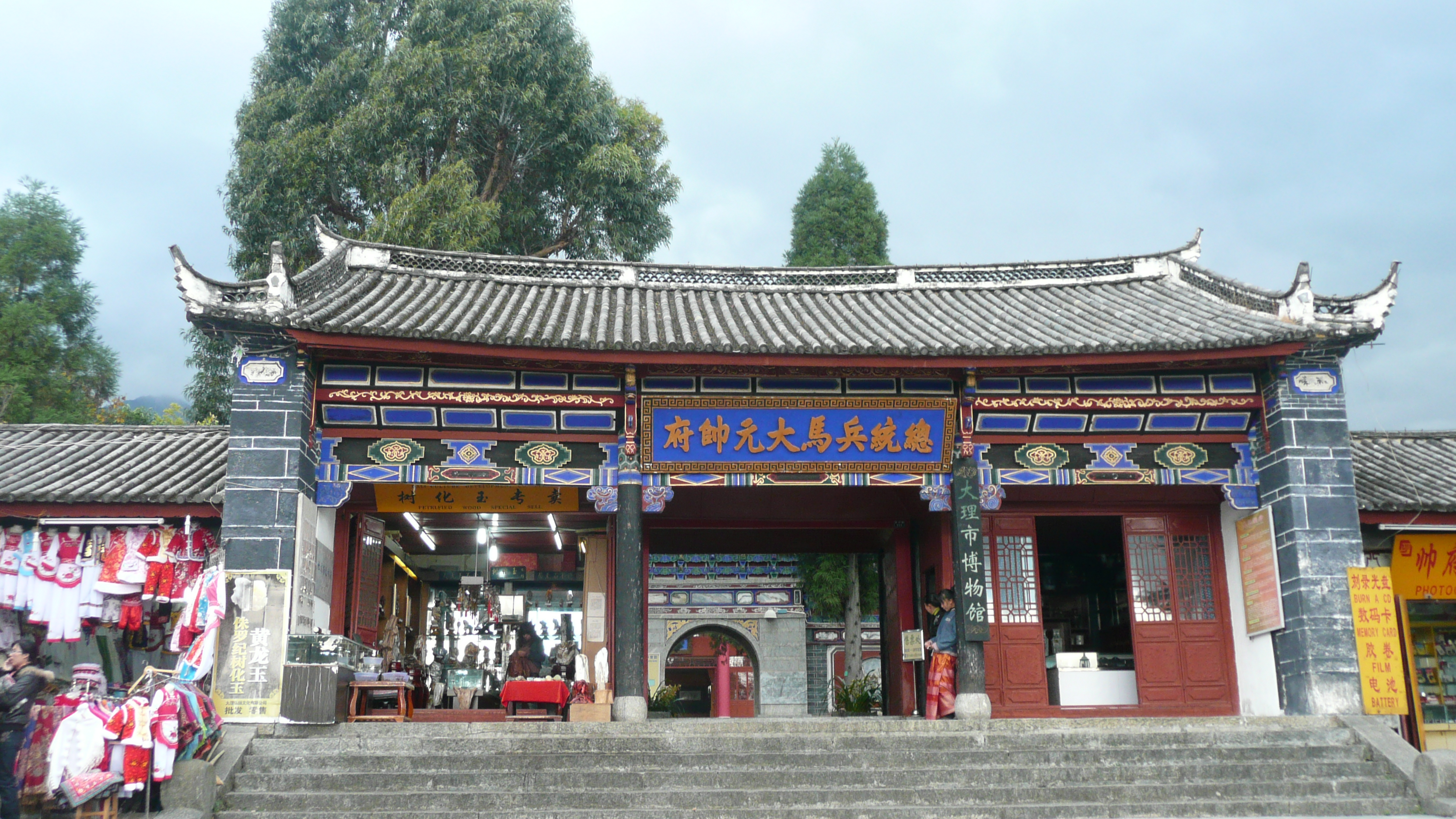
Du Wenxiu's headquarters in Dali, Yunnan; now the Dali City Museum

During his last offensive in 1867; Du Wenxiu declared in his "Proclamation from the Headquarters of the Generalissimo", that:

"this army expedition was caused by the Manchus' taking China from us and staying in power for more than two hundred years, treating people as oxen and horses, having no regard for the value of life, hurting my compatriots, and wiping out my fellow Hui (wo Huizu)."

He styled himself "Sultan of Dali" and reigned for 16 years before Qing troops under Cen Yuying beheaded him after he swallowed a ball of opium. The Qing eventually battled their way to Dali and on December 25,1872; thousands of Qing troops encircled Dali. Du's top general Yang Rong advised him to surrender fearing disastrous consequences for the populace if resistance continued. Du concurred and decided to surrender the next morning, telling his council that:

"What you have said is true. If this generalissimo [Du] decides to fight to the death, then truly not even a chicken or dog will be left alive. If this generalissimo leaves the city, then I can save the old and the young."

He had handed himself over to the Qing hoping that the city's residents would be spared, telling General Yang Yuke "spare the people (shao sharen)". However the Qing troops carried out a bloody massacre of the Hui populace; killing ten thousand people (four thousand of whom were women, children and the elderly). Du's head was encased in honey & sent to Beijing along with 24 baskets filled with the ears of the dead. Du's body is entombed in Xiadui.

His capital was Dali. The revolt ended in 1873. Du Wenxiu is regarded as a hero by the present day government of China.

Du Wenxiu's life and related historical facts are a major element of Tariq Ali's novel Night of the Golden Butterfly.
