= Helen Wu =

Chinese Canadian martial artist (born 1956)

- Born: 1956 (age 69–70); Shanghai, China
- Style: Qigong, tai chi, Flying Rainbow Fan, xingyiquan, baguazhang, Northern Shaolin kung fu

Helen Wu (born 1956) is a Chinese Muslim martial artist living in Toronto, Ontario, Canada. The daughter of Wang Jurong and Wu Chengde, she began her martial arts training at age three with her mother and her grandfather, Wang Ziping, the world-renowned Wushu Grandmaster.

== Education and research ==
After graduating from Shanghai University, Wu began teaching in the Department of Sports Medicine.

Currently, Wu lives and teaches in Toronto, Ontario, Canada, where she has served on the board of the Canadian Taijiquan Federation and United Wushu Federation of Canada. She is also a faculty member at the York University School of Kinesiology and Health Science.

Wu has acted as a consultant on several studies examining the benefits of qigong:

- The Effects of Vigorous Exercise Training on Motor Function and Functional, Fitness in Juvenile Arthritis. Dr. Brian M Feldman
- Feasibility and Impact of Qigong as Compared to Aerobic Exercise in the Treatment of Childhood Chronic Musculo-Skeletal Pain: A Pilot Randomized Controlled Trial, Dr Shirley ML Tse MD FRCPC; Dr. Brian M Feldman

== Professional accomplishments ==
Wu has coached several medal-winning athletes.

- Silver Medal, Group Events Category, U.S.A All-Taijiquan Competition (1999)
- 19 Medals including Silver and Bronze All-Round Grand Championships, U.S.A All-Taijiquan Competition (2000)
- 23 Medals including Bronze All-Round Grand Championships, U.S.A All-Taijiquan Competition (2001)

Wu co-authored with Wen-Ching Wu Tai Chi Single Fan for Health and Martial Arts and Chi-Kung, Tai Chi and Fan: A Step by Step Training Course for Wellness and Personal Development. There were used as a text for her courses at York University.

Wu has also published articles for martial arts magazines: Flying Rainbow: The Fan of Martial Arts co-authored with Marsha Zeust for Kungfu Magazine (1999) and A Fan for Life for Inside Kung-fu magazine (2007).
