= Mong (surname) =

Méng
Origin
- Meaning: cover, deceive, shadow

Mong or Meng (Chinese: 蒙; pinyin: Méng; Wade–Giles: Meng) is a Chinese surname. It is a xing (姓) (ancestral surname). The surname is typically romanised as Meng in Mandarin and Mong or Mung in Cantonese. Other romanisations include Mông, Muhng, Mang, and Bong.

Most people with the surname Mong are from the Guangdong or Fujian Province areas. The surname is currently most popular in the Guangxi Autonomous Region.

The character 蒙 is also used as an abbreviation for Mongolia (蒙古國).

== People surnamed Mong ==
Notable people with the surname Mong or Meng include:

- William Mong, Hong Kong businessman
- Meng Dalai, Ming-dynasty political figure
- Meng Ao, Warring States-era military general
- Meng Wu, son of Meng Ao
- Meng Tian, son of Meng Wu
- Meng Yi, son of Meng Wu
- Meng Caicheng, participant in the Xinhai Revolution
- Meng Daqiao, Chinese nuclear scientist
- Meng Dengjin, Chinese historian and scholar of philosophy
- Meng Dingjun, Chinese politician and intelligence officer
- Meng De'en, senior official in the Taiping Heavenly Kingdom
- Meng Gan, 11th-century Song-dynasty political rebel
- Meng Hui, Ming-dynasty political figure
- Meng Jinxi, Chinese lieutenant general in the People's Liberation Army
- Mong Kwan Yi, Hong Kong badminton player
- Yoyo Mung Ka-wai, Hong Kong actress
- Meng Lanfeng, Chinese politician
- Meng Man, Manchu scholar
- Meng Meilu, Chinese politician
- Meng Peiyuan, Chinese historian and scholar of philosophy
- Meng Qixun, Chinese political figure
- Meng Qiliang, member of the Chinese Communist Party
- Meng Shiyong, official in the Taiping Heavenly Kingdom
- Meng Sufen, Chinese politician
- Meng Wentong, Chinese historian specialising in pre-Qin dynasty history
- Meng Shaoling, Chinese politician
- Meng Yongshan, Chinese procurator
- Joseph Meng Ziwen, Chinese Catholic bishop
- Meng Zhengfa, Ming-dynasty political figure
- Meng Hu, Mongolian internet blogger who goes by the name "酒徒"
- Mung Wai Leong, Hong Kong reporter and radio host
- Shi Renqing, Chinese monk whose secular name was Meng Wending (蒙文登)
- Mong Hon-ming, Hong Kong media worker and former editor-in-chief of East Week
- Meng Zhao, Ming-dynasty political figure

== See also ==
- Mengzi City (southeast Yunnan Province)
- Mengyin County (southwest-central Shandong)
