= Chinese Poetry Congress =

- 人生自有诗意 (Translation: Life's poetic)

Chinese name
- Traditional Chinese: 中國詩詞大會
- Simplified Chinese: 中国诗词大会
Transcriptions
Standard Mandarin
- Hanyu Pinyin: Zhōngguó Shīcí Dàhuì
- Genre: Quiz show
- Directed by: Yan Fang
- Presented by: Dong Qing
- Country of origin: China
- Original language: Standard Chinese
- No. of seasons: 4

Production
- Executive producer: Li Ting
- Producers: Kan Zhaojiang; Liang Hong
- Running time: 92 minutes

Original release
- Network: China Central Television
- Release: February 12, 2016 – present

Related
- Chinese Characters Dictation Competition; Chinese Idioms Congress

Chinese Poetry Conference (Chinese: 中国诗词大会; pinyin: Zhōngguó Shīcí Dàhuì) is an ongoing game show on China Central Television that tests competitors' memory and reciting of Chinese poetry, including classical and modern forms of shi, ci, and qu. It is related to several other game shows, such as Chinese Characters Dictation Competition and Chinese Idioms Congress.

== Opening poetry ==
Every episode of the show starts with quotations from a piece of classical Chinese poetry. In the first season, ten pieces were quoted. Note: the following pinyin tones show original, or standard pronunciation, not including tone sandhis on special syllables.

Episode No.	Quotation	Pinyin	Author
1	天生我材必有用，千金散尽还复来	tiān shēng wǒ cái bì yǒu yòng, qiān jīn sàn jìn huán fù lái	Li Bai
2	随意春芳歇，王孙自可留	suí yì chūn fāng xiē, wáng sūn zì kě liú	Wang Wei
3	野火烧不尽，春风吹又生	yě huǒ shāo bù jìn, chūn fēng chuī yòu shēng	Bai Juyi
4	黄鹤一去不复返，白云千载空悠悠	huáng hè yī qù bù fù fǎn, bái yún qiān zǎi kōng yōu yōu	Cui Hao
5	春蚕到死丝方尽，蜡炬成灰泪始干	chūn cán dào sǐ sī fāng jìn, là jù chéng huī lèi shǐ gān	Li Shangyin
6	海内存知己，天涯若比邻	hǎi nèi cún zhī jǐ, tiān yá ruò bǐ lín	Wang Bo
7	会当凌绝顶，一览众山小	huì dāng líng jué dǐng, yī lǎn zhòng shān xiǎo	Du Fu
8	但使龙城飞将在，不教胡马度阴山	dàn shǐ lóng chéng fēi jiàng zài, bù jiāo hú mǎ dù yīn shān	Wang Changling
9	稻花香里说丰年，听取蛙声一片	dào huā xiāng lǐ shuō fēng nián, tīng qǔ wā shēng yī piàn	Xin Qiji
10	大江东去，浪淘尽，千古风流人物	dà jiāng dōng qù, làng táo jìn, qiān gǔ fēng liú rén wù	Su Shi

In the second season, the off-stage contestants no longer read poems, and the presenter of the show read instead.

== Gameplay ==
The show follows a two-part game. In the first part, there are 105 contestants competing, 5 that have done best in the previous episode on stage and 100 off stage (called "百人团", lit. hundred people team). The ones on stage select their set of ten questions one by one, and answer them in order. Off-stage contestants answer simultaneously on iPads. If they answer correctly in 10 seconds, the number of other participants that answer incorrectly add to their score. Otherwise, their game is over. When a contestant's score surpasses another's, the latter is eliminated.

The second part sees the best of the five challenging the contestant that has done best during the season, and they have to answer a series of tougher questions in order to win the challenge. One such segment is the fei hua ling (飞花令, lit. "flying flower game"), a section where the two contestants must constantly think of and recite verses that contain a particular character or reference a particular theme. The intensity of this section has contributed to the show's popularity.

The second season introduces a more "reasonable" gameplay: every episode, four contestants are selected from the hundred-contestants team, and follow part one from the first season; then the best of them has to challenge the fastest and most correct off-stage contestant to decide who would be the best of the episode, and may accept challenges from people that compete later. The first four contestants (in the opening episode) were chosen as the best performers of a non-broadcast written test and subsequent auditions.

In the fourth season, the questions are related to a certain keyword. If a contestant answers a question wrong, he or she is given a 'redemption' opportunity through succeeding at any of 3 challenges: completing a game of fei hua ling against 12 other participants from the entire off-stage participant panel, answering guessing game-style questions about poetry, or managing to recite one verse relating every of 12 given themes. The challenge for the contestant is chosen randomly. This opportunity is not presented on the second incorrect answer.

=== Question format ===
==== Round 1 ====
The first round contains nine questions:

- Identify the line. Choose the correct characters from 9 or 12 characters to form a line of a poem.
- Missing character/line. Fill in the missing character or complete the missing line.
- Multiple choice.

==== Round 2 ====
Each of the two contestants must alternatively give two poem lines, containing a chosen character. The game ends when one of the two contestants cannot name another sentence.

==== Championship Round ====
Winner of Round 2 and the returning champion play a best-of-nine final, all the questions are on the buzzer. The first 3 questions are related to drawings, where contestants are required to identify a line related to the painting. The next 6 questions are guessing questions related to four cues. 1 point will be given for each correct answer, and for each wrong answer, the opponent scores. First to score 5 points will be determined as the champion, and return for the next episode.

== Cast ==
=== Presenter ===
The presenter of Chinese Poetry Congress is Dong Qing, known for co-hosting CCTV New Year's Gala for years. She serves as both a host and a narrator. During a re-recording, Dong, by accident, fell off the stage and hurt her kneecap. However, she insisted on continuing the recording under a cold compression, and eventually completed the show. Dong also performed, reciting a poem in Shanghainese, singing Su Shi's Shui diao ge tou, and quoting numerous Chinese idioms on air.

=== Judges ===
- Li Bo (郦波) is a Nanjing Normal University literature professor, having been giving lessons at CCTV's Lecture Room, a program on which scholars share their works and make statements on various subjects. Li was also a judge on Chinese Idioms Congress.
- Meng Man (蒙曼) is a master-advisor of Minzu University of China, working on ancient Chinese women. Meng was also a lecturer on Lecture Room and a judge on Chinese Idioms Congress.
- Wang Liqun (王立群) is a Henan University professor and Doctor-advisor and a pioneer on studying ancient Chinese literature and culture.
- Kang Zhen (康震) is a Beijing Normal University professor and Doctor-advisor.

=== The Hundred Contestants Team ===
The people that answer questions off-stage are from all walks of life such as teachers, students, peasants, and the police, not restricted to Chinese residents. The ages range from 7 to 55. They follow the narrator's reciting opening poetry and count to the points that an on-stage contestant gets if their answer is incorrect. Due to the limited time of 10 seconds to answer on a tablet computer, a large quantity of contestants failed to complete verses that are usually taught in China's primary schools, for example, Meng Haoran's Ode to the Willow (traditional Chinese: 詠柳; simplified Chinese: 咏柳; pinyin: Yǒng Liǔ), leading to criticism on the team, as they were described as "The regular studio audience".

In the fourth season, the team is divided into four groups: children, teenage students, working people from various employments, and duos (formed from friends, family, lovers, or other close relations).

== Awards ==
In the 22nd Shanghai Television Festival, Chinese Poetry Congress was awarded the best variety show.
