= Zhang Hongjie (writer) =

Chinese writer and historian (born 1972)

- 张宏杰
- Born: April 1972 (age 54); Jianchang County, Liaoning, China
- Education: Dongbei University of Finance and Economics; Fudan University; Tsinghua University
- Occupation: Writer
- Writing career
- Language: Chinese
- Period: 2006–present
- Genres: Historical biography, essay
- Notable works: Seven Faces of the Ming Dynasty; The Flourishing Age of Hunger: Gains and Losses in the Qianlong Period

Chinese name
- Traditional Chinese: 張宏傑
- Simplified Chinese: 张宏杰
Transcriptions
Standard Mandarin
- Hanyu Pinyin: Zhāng Hóngjié

Zhang Hongjie (Chinese: 张宏杰; born April 1972) is a Chinese writer and historian who works in the Institute of Qing History, Renmin University of China. He is a member of the China Writers Association.

== Biography ==
Zhang was born in Jianchang County, Liaoning in April 1972. He completed his bachelor's degree in economic in Dongbei University of Finance and Economics. He earned his doctor's degree in history from the Institute of Chinese Historical Geography, Fudan University. He did post-doctoral research at the Department of History, Tsinghua University.

In 2013, Zhang appeared on CCTV-10's Lecture Room programme.

== Works ==
- 曾国藩传 [Biography of Zeng Guofan] (in Chinese). Beijing: Democracy and Construction Publishing House. 2019. ISBN 9787513921091.
- 饥饿的盛世：乾隆时代的得与失 [The Hungered Flourishing Age: Gains and Losses in the Qianlong Period] (in Chinese). Chongqing: Chongqing Publishing House. 2016. ISBN 978-7-229-10667-6.
- 坐天下：张宏杰解读中国帝王 [Sitting in the Throne: Zhang Hongjie's Interpretation of Chinese Emperors] (in Chinese). Beijing: People's Literature Publishing House. 2018. ISBN 9787020141418.
- 曾国藩的正面与侧面 [Zeng Guofan's Front and Side] (in Chinese). Changsha, Hunan: Yuelu Shushe. 2018. ISBN 9787553808833.
- 朱元璋传 [Biography of Zhu Yuanzhang] (in Chinese). Guangzhou, Guangdong: Guangdong People's Publishing House. 2016. ISBN 9787218108483.
- 张宏杰讲乾隆成败 [Zhang Hongjie's Comments on the Success or Failure of Qianlong Emperor] (in Chinese). Beijing: Democracy and Construction Publishing House. 2014. ISBN 9787513902885.
- 给曾国藩算算账：一个清代高官的收与支 [Settling Accounts for Zeng Guofan: The Income and Expenditure of a Senior Official in Qing Dynasty] (in Chinese). Changsha, Hunan: Zhonghua Book Company. 2016. ISBN 9787101108965.
- 中国国民性演变历程 [The Evolution of Chinese Nationality] (in Chinese). Changsha, Hunan: Hunan Literature and Art Publishing House. 2016. ISBN 9787540476861.
- 千年悖论：人性的历史实验记录 [Millennium Paradox: Historical Experimental Record of Human Nature] (in Chinese). Chongqing: Chongqing Publishing House. 2019. ISBN 9787229135621.
