= Approaching Science =

Chinese television series

Approaching Science (Chinese: 走近科学; pinyin: Zǒujìn Kēxué) was a documentary film program of China's CCTV-10. It was first broadcast on June 1, 1998, and has become a "popular program of CCTV". The programme ceased to continue after the last episode was aired on 30 September 2019. Its host was Zhang Tengyue.

The subjects of the program include biology, archaeology, psychology, etc.

== Reception ==
Positive

Approaching science has received positive reviews, as it was in line with the condition of a large number of Chinese people with low education and a large number of so-called "supernatural events" circulating among the people at that time. It disenchanted all kinds of so-called "supernatural events" and guided the people to believe in scientific interpretation. The program has changed the previous Chinese popular science TV programs, and it was known as "an interest revolution in TV science programs".

Negative

Approaching Science has received negative reviews as it "lacks science confirm", "claims that concerned person is suffering from hysteria when experts' methods are unable to explain strange phenomenon around concerned person", "exaggerate scare atmosphere" which makes the program to be perceived as pseudoscience.
