= Mao Peiqi =

Chinese historian

Mao Peiqi (Chinese: 毛佩琦; pinyin: Máo Pèiqí) is a Chinese historian, expert in the history of the Ming Dynasty, a professor at the School of History, Renmin University of China.

Mao became popular in China for his lectures on Ming's history in the CCTV-10 program Lecture Room in 2005. Based upon his CCTV lecture, Mao published a book, The Seventeen Emperors of the Ming Dynasty (毛佩琦细解明朝十七帝 ISBN 7-80206-237-3) in 2006.
