= Kang Zhen =

- 康震
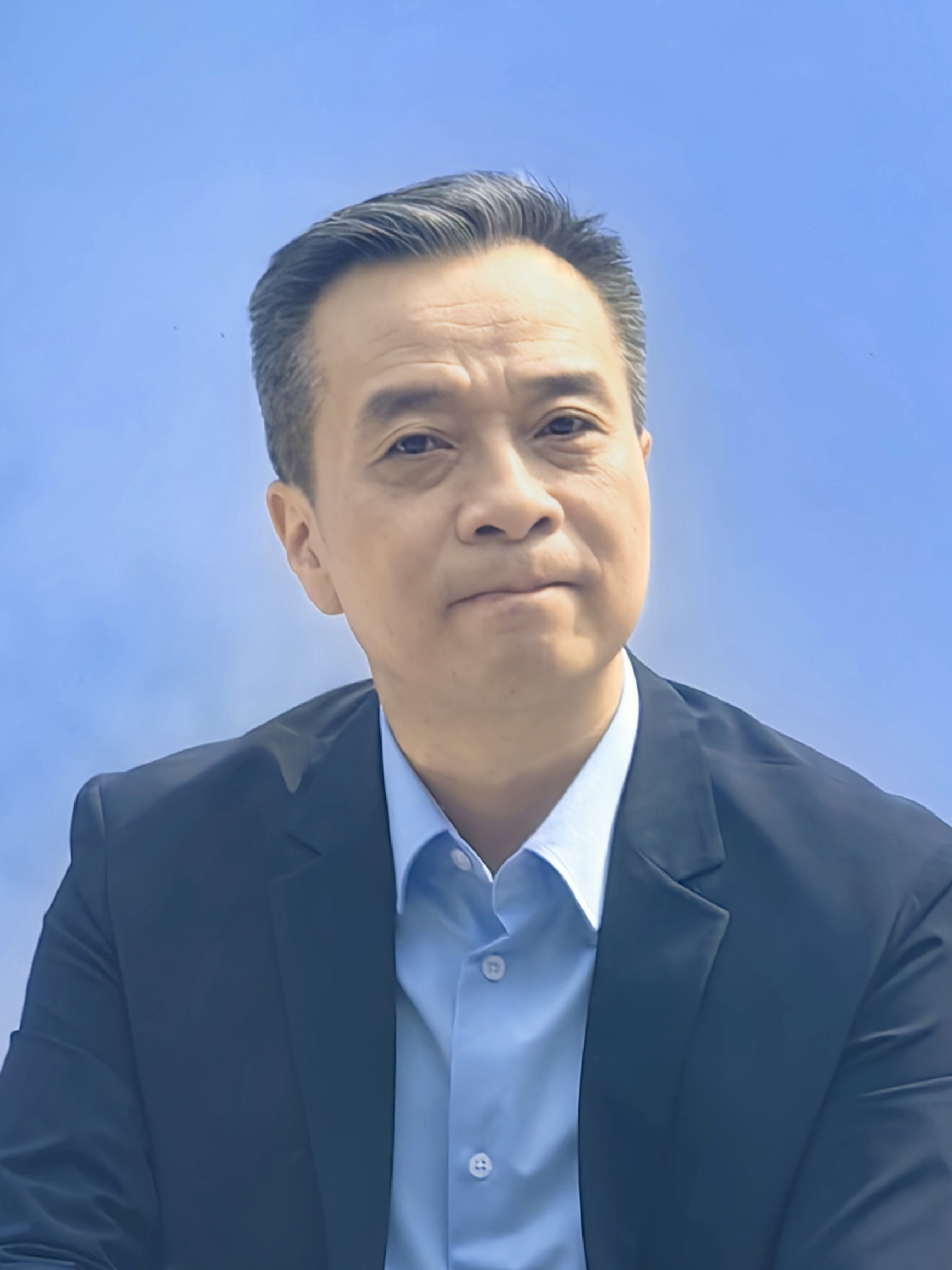
- Kang Zhen in 2026
- Born: March 1970 (age 56); Suide County, Shaanxi, China
- Education: Shaanxi Normal University
- Occupations: Scholar, writer
- Known for: Lecturing on Lecture Room
- Television: China Central Television (CCTV)

Kang Zhen (Chinese: 康震; pinyin: Kāng Zhèn; born March 1970) is a Chinese scholar and a professor at the College of Arts, Beijing Normal University. He is best known for conducting lecture series about Chinese literature on the CCTV-10 television programme Lecture Room.

== Biography ==
Kang was born in Suide County, Shaanxi in March 1970. He attended Shaanxi Normal University from 1989 to 2000, graduating with a Master of Arts. He earned his Doctor of Letters under the direction of Huo Songlin (霍松林).

In 2006, he received an invitation to be a lecturer on the television programme Lecture Room shown on CCTV-10. Since then, he has conducted four lecture series–Li Bai, Du Fu, Li Qingzhao and the Eight Great Writers of Tang and Song Dynasties.

Since 2002, he taught at Beijing Normal University. He was deputy director of the Institute of Ancient Chinese Literature from 2003-2004, and he was elected deputy party chief for 2004 and vice-dean of the College of Arts for 2006.

== Works ==
- 康震讲苏东坡 [Su Dongpo] (in Chinese). Beijing: Zhonghua Book Company. 2018. ISBN 9787101129694.
- 康震讲诗仙李白 [Li Bai] (in Chinese). Beijing: Zhonghua Book Company. 2018. ISBN 9787101128666.
- 康震讲韩愈 [Han Yu] (in Chinese). Beijing: Zhonghua Book Company. 2018. ISBN 9787101129588.
- 康震讲王安石 [Wang Anshi] (in Chinese). Beijing: Zhonghua Book Company. 2018. ISBN 9787101130515.
- 康震讲诗圣杜甫 [Du Fu] (in Chinese). Beijing: Zhonghua Book Company. 2018. ISBN 9787101127201.
- 康震讲欧阳修 曾巩 [Ouyang Xiu and Zeng Gong] (in Chinese). Beijing: Zhonghua Book Company. 2018. ISBN 9787101130614.
- 康震讲三苏 [The Su Family] (in Chinese). Beijing: Zhonghua Book Company. 2018. ISBN 9787101127287.
- 康震讲柳宗元 [Liu Zongyuan] (in Chinese). Beijing: Zhonghua Book Company. 2018. ISBN 9787101130621.
- 康震讲诗词经典 [Classical Poetry] (in Chinese). Beijing: Zhonghua Book Company. 2018. ISBN 9787101128673.
