= Yi Zhongtian =

Chinese writer and historian (born 1947)

Yi Zhongtian 易中天
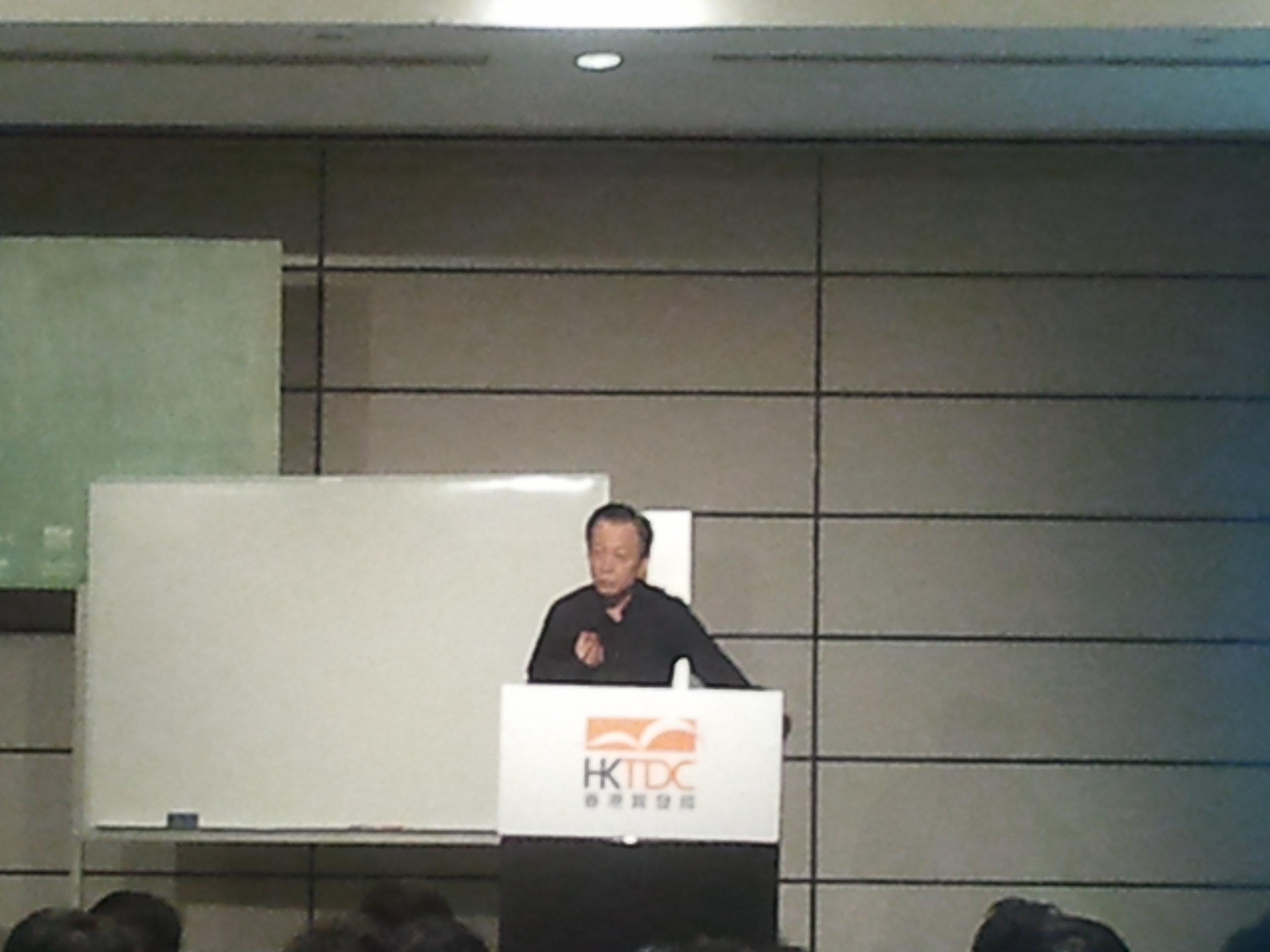
- Yi giving a talk at the Hong Kong Convention and Exhibition Centre in July 2013
- Born: February 8, 1947 (age 79); Changsha, Hunan Province, Republic of China
- Education: Wuhan University (BA & MA)
- Occupation: Historian
- Writing career
- Language: Mandarin Chinese
- Subjects: Literature, art, aesthetics, psychology, anthropology, history
- Notable works: Pin Ren Lu (品人录); Du Cheng Ji (读城记); Pin San Guo (品三国); Xian Qin Zhuzi Baijia Zhengming (先秦诸子百家争鸣)

Yi Zhongtian (born 8 February 1947) is a Chinese historian. He is also a professor and Ph.D. supervisor at the Department of Chinese Language and Literature at Xiamen University's School of Humanities.

== Life and career ==
Yi's grandfather, Yi Silin (易思麟; 1885–1983), graduated from the Hunan Law School (湖南法政学堂; now part of Hunan University) and served as the acting county magistrate of Dao County, Hunan Province. He became a self-taught physician after leaving office. Yi's uncle, Yi Rengai (易仁荄; 1908–1990), graduated from Tsinghua University's Department of History in 1935. Yi's father, Yi Tingyuan (易庭源; 1919–2011), was an accountant.

Yi spent his childhood in his birthplace, Changsha, Hunan Province, before moving to Wuhan, Hubei province at the age of six. He attended Yuemachang Primary School (阅马场小学) and No. 1 Middle School attached to Central China Normal University (华中师范大学第一附属中学).

Between 1965 and 1975, Yi went to Xinjiang to join the Xinjiang Production and Construction Corps. From 1975 to 1978, he taught at a middle school for the children of employees at a steel production firm in Urumqi, Xinjiang.

Yi studied ancient Chinese literature in Wuhan University under the tutelage of Hu Guorui (胡国瑞) and graduated in 1978 with a BA. In 1981, after obtaining a MA degree from Wuhan University, he became a lecturer at his alma mater. He is currently a professor and PhD supervisor in the Department of Chinese Language and Literature at Xiamen University's School of Humanities.

== Works ==
Yi's academic interests include literature, art, aesthetics, psychology, anthropology and history. His published works focus on popularising academic subjects. This has caused some controversy, but has also led to the popularity of his works.

In 2005, Yi appeared on CCTV-10's Lecture Room programme. His series of lectures on personalities of the Han dynasty and the Three Kingdoms period were successful, but there was also criticism about the academic quality of his lectures. Due to the popularity of his lectures, in 2006 CCTV-10 made a contract with him to produce a series of 52 lectures on the history of the Three Kingdoms period. In 2008, he started a series of 36 lectures about the Hundred Schools of Thought on Lecture Room.

In 2013, Yi wrote Yi Zhongtian Zhonghua Shi (易中天中华史; Yi Zhongtian's History of China). A year later, he wrote San Guo Ji (三国纪; Chronicles of the Three Kingdoms) to dispel myths about the historical figures Cao Cao, Liu Bei, Sun Quan and Zhuge Liang.

=== List of works ===
- Chinese culture series:
  - Xianhua Zhongguo Ren (闲话中国人; The Gossiping Chinese)
  - Zhongguo De Nanren He Nüren (中国的男人和女人; China's Men and Women)
  - Du Cheng Ji (读城记; Reading and Cities)
  - Pin Ren Lu (品人录; Analysis of People)
- CCTV-10 Lecture Room series:
  - Han Dai Fengyun Renwu (汉代风云人物; Prominent Personalities of the Han Dynasty)
  - Pin San Guo (品三国; Analysis of the Three Kingdoms)
  - Xian Qin Zhuzi Baijia Zhengming (先秦诸子百家争鸣; The Hundred Schools of Thought Before the Qin Dynasty)
- Politics:
  - Diguo De Chouchang (帝国的惆怅; Melancholy of the Empire)
  - Diguo De Zhongjie (帝国的终结; End of the Empire)
  - Feicheng Fengyun: Meiguo Xianfa De Dansheng He Women De Fansi (费城风云：美国宪法的诞生和我们的反思; Philadelphia: The Birth of the United States Constitution and Our Reflections)
- Aesthetics:
  - Po Men Er Ru (破门而入; Forced Entry)
- Social sciences:
  - Chengdu Fangshi (成都方式; The Chengdu Method)
- Essays:
  - Shusheng Yiqi (书生意气; Scholar's Spirit)
  - Shusheng Shaqi (书生傻气; Scholar's Foolishness)
  - Gao Gao De Shu Shang (高高的树上; High Up on the Tree)
- Others:
  - Dahua Fangyan (大话方言; Discussion on Dialects)
  - Zhongguo Zhihui (中国智慧; Chinese Intelligence)
  - Wo Shan Zhi Shi (我山之石; The Rock of My Mountain)
  - Yi Zhongtian Zhonghua Shi (易中天中华史; Yi Zhongtian's History of China)
