= Exploring the Art of Chinese Handicraft =

- The Poster of "Exploring the Art of Chinese Handicraft"
- Written by: Zhang Jing
- Directed by: Zhang Jing
- Narrated by: Zhang Jing
- Music by: Xiao He; Zhong Lifeng
- Original language: Chinese

Production
- Producer: Zhang Jing
- Cinematography: He Sigeng
- Editor: Zhang Jing
- Running time: 200 minutes
- Production companies: Beijing Heji Brothers Culture Communication Co., Ltd.

Original release
- Release: October 2017

Exploring the Art of Chinese Handicraft is a Mainland China documentary series directed by Zhang Jing and produced by Beijing Heji Brothers Cultural Communication Co., Ltd.This documentary seeks out and photographs 199 Chinese craftsmen and their craftsmanship and stories.The documentary filming technique is rough, using walking second person for narration, and has been rejected by 13 television stations.On April 19, 2017, Zhang Jing posted it on Bilibili (B site), and received positive comments from netizens and media. In 2018, the film was broadcast on the CCTV science and education channel。

== Shooting Ideas ==
According to Zhang Jing, he passed through different regions of China and widened himself with rich regional survival and living skills.He believes that "some wisdom can at least be retained as an image, after all, this wisdom has allowed China to continue for thousands of years." "It is necessary to let children know that China is far more than just those you often see around you. So Exploring the Art of Chinese Handicraft came into being.

Zhang Jing chose to start a business after working at China Central Television(CCTV). When he was struggling to collect debts, he called it "this is not the life he wants". Zhang Jing has worshipped craftsmen since he was a child, and recording them with a lens has always been Zhang Jing's dream. So he decided to realize his dream and make a documentary film that makes him proud.

== Plot ==
There are five episodes in Exploring the Art of Chinese Handicraft, which uses walking second-person narration, which records a total of 199 unknown artisans in remote rural areas, as well as their craftsmanship and stories. The biggest difference between this documentary and other documentaries is that there are no special effects and suspense except for the walking second-person narration；It uses a plain "storyization" narrative； And the personal emotions and stories of the shooting team are integrated in it. There are even technical problems in the film.

Episodes
Episodes	Name	Time
E01	Beijing-Xinjiang	37:44
E02	Xinjiang-Tibet	42:10
E03	Tibet-Yunnan	41:32
E04	Guizhou-Hunan	42:56
E05	To the South, and then to the North	44:04

== Production Process ==
=== Preliminary Preparation ===
Zhang Jing is a professional director who worked for CCTV before founding his own media company. In order to film Exploring the Art of Chinese Handicraft, he sold his house in Beijing for 400,000 yuan, and borrowed 700,000 filming funds for a total of 1.1 million. The shooting team consists of four people: director Zhang Jing, cameraman Jiang Yingsong, driver He Sigeng, and Yu Pan, who is responsible for contacting and asking for directions.

Zhang Jing purchased two second-hand cameras, two second-hand lenses, one second-hand recorder, and one second-hand car as all the equipment for shooting. Zhang Jing also collected more than 10,000 planned shooting points from National Geographic magazine, and finally screened out more than 400 planned shooting points. In fact, many shooting spots are invalid for various reasons, which makes many pictures taken at random. For example, the handicrafts in Quyang County, Hebei Province have been industrialized and have lost their shooting value.

=== Shooting Process ===
At 5:30 am on May 8, 2014, the four-person team set off. The cameraman Xiao Jiang withdrew from shooting due to rhinitis treatment. He Sigeng, a driver with no TV production experience, had to work as a cameraman, and Yu Pan worked as a sound engineer.

Their shooting modes are：

At a shooting point, if I am not interested, I will ask Yu Pan and He Sigeng if they are interested. If one of them is interested, then the other two of us will serve him and help him record what he is interested, If none of us are interested, then we will withdraw.

On the 126th day, they arrived in Gaomi City, Shandong Province, and ended the shooting. The film crew reached 23 provinces in China in 126 days, visited 199 craftsmen, and recorded 144 traditional crafts.

=== Post-production ===
Four months after filming, the film entered the post-production process. The post-production has lasted for two years, the commentary has been changed nearly 50 times, and the post-dubbing is more than 10 times. In addition, the original soundtrack of the film's theme song and other music was created by Xiao He and Zhong Lifeng. The opening song of the whole drama is Black Bird, where are you；the ending song of the first episode is the music played by Tanbuer and Kumzi introduced in the film, which is improvised by local people；The ending theme of the two episodes is The Heart Sutra, which mentions the Buddhist craftsmanship；the latter three episodes use the ending theme A Tree in the Forest.

=== Release ===
The film was originally scheduled to be broadcast on TV stations, but has been rejected by 13 TV stations. After that, Exploring the Art of Chinese Handicraft premiered in Beijing Chaoyangmen Community Cultural Life Museum. Among the audience present was a member of the Bilibili Barrage Video Network staff. He contacted Zhang Jing, hoping that he would upload the video to Station B and make recommendations on the documentary page for free. On April 19, 2017, Exploring the Art of Chinese Handicraft was released on Bilibili. As of November 2018, the film has received 1.5 million views and has 104,000 moving comments. In 2018, the film was finally broadcast on CCTV-10.

== Reviews ==
=== Comments ===
==== Positive Comments ====
A classmate of Zhang Jing mobilized more than 2,000 teenagers to watch this documentary and made a questionnaire. Most of them thought that Exploring the Art of Chinese Handicraft was “beautiful and warm”. Netizens and the media also gave a positive evaluation of Exploring the Art of Chinese Handicraft. As of October 2018, the film received a high score of 9.9 on Bilibili and 8.8 in the Douban movie.

The famous movie public account Sir Movie was one of the public accounts that first helped promote the show before Exploring the Art of Chinese Handicraft became popular. It commented: "Listening to the CCTV wind that is used to the roundness of the character, the earthy ‘human words’ in this film are surprisingly cute.”

Guangming Daily published an article commenting that most of the film's stupid effort was transferred to various places and searched around. The "clumsy feeling" embodied in the film "shows simplicity and sincerity, which matches the audience's true Deep demand ".

The popularity of Exploring the Art of Chinese Handicraft also triggered people's reflection on the chaos in the film and television industry. In an article published by Zhenjiang Civilization Network, he praised Exploring the Art of Chinese Handicraft to put energy into the shooting content itself, and presented the social topics that the director focused on in a plain and simple way. And said that the current "film and television industry has become an arena of capital."

==== Negative Comments ====
This film has been rejected by 13 television stations. They believed that the documentary picture was not beautiful enough and the composition was not rigorous enough. The radio microphone and the staff appeared at will, thinking that Zhang Jing should be re-produced.

Wu Chen of the School of Journalism and Media of Yangzhou University, while analysing the Exploring the Art of Chinese Handicraft, while expressing a positive evaluation of this documentary, also said that the film has some shortcomings. The introduction of craftsmanship is too lacking.

=== Awards ===
At the West Lake International Documentary Conference held in Hangzhou, Zhejiang Province, China from October 18 to 20, 2018, Exploring the Art of Chinese Handicraft was shortlisted for the "D20 Nomination" evaluation unit.。
