= Soft detention =

Form of house arrest used in China

Soft detention (simplified Chinese: 软禁; traditional Chinese: 軟禁; pinyin: ruǎnjìn) is a form of house arrest used in the People's Republic of China to control political dissidents. It has its roots in the practices of the Chinese Empire which employed it as early as the Northern Song dynasty when those such as Su Shi who criticized the emperor were subjected to it. Traditionally, and in modern practice, there are three levels of restriction; the loosest, "juzhu", restricts the detainee to their home district. This restriction was employed on the history teacher Yuan Tengfei who included information about banned aspects of modern Chinese history in his lectures. The second level, "anzhi", employed anciently on Su Shi, restricts the prisoner to their home, but they may be allowed to go for a walk or go to work. The severest form, "bianguan", which was imposed on the human rights activist Chen Guangcheng involves limited movement of the prisoner to their home, constant surveillance, restriction of contact with others, and, sometimes, harassment.

== See also ==
- Shuanggui
