= Chen Guangcheng =

Chinese civil rights activist (born 1971)

- 陈光诚
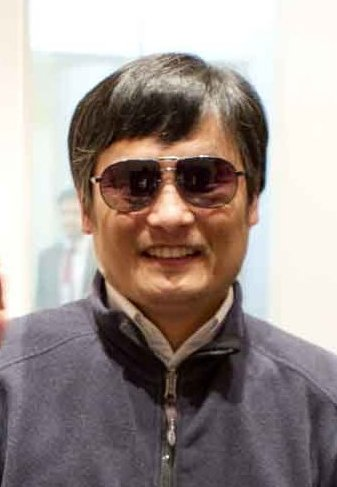
- Chen in 2012
- Born: November 12, 1971 (age 54); Dongshigu, Shandong, China
- Citizenship: China (formerly); United States (from 2021)
- Education: Nanjing University of Traditional Chinese Medicine
- Occupation: Civil rights activist
- Years active: 2006–present
- Known for: Anti-corruption activism
- Political party: Republican
- Spouse: Yuan Weijing
- Children: 2
- Awards: Time 100 (2006); Ramon Magsaysay Award (2007)

Chinese name
- Simplified Chinese: 陈光诚
- Traditional Chinese: 陳光誠
Transcriptions
Standard Mandarin
- Hanyu Pinyin: Chén Guāngchéng
- IPA: [ʈʂʰə̌n kwáŋʈʂʰə̌ŋ]

Chen Guangcheng (born November 12, 1971) is a Chinese civil rights activist who has worked on human rights issues in rural areas of the People's Republic of China. Blind from an early age and self-taught in the law, Chen is frequently described as a "barefoot lawyer" who advocates for land rights and the welfare of the poor.

In 2005 Chen gained international recognition for organising a landmark class-action lawsuit against authorities in Linyi, Shandong province, for the excessive enforcement of the one-child policy. As a result of this lawsuit, Chen was placed under house arrest from September 2005 to March 2006, with a formal arrest in June 2006. On August 24, 2006 Chen was sentenced to four years and three months for "damaging property and organising a mob to disturb traffic." He was released from prison in 2010 after serving his full sentence, but remained under house arrest or "soft detention" at his home in Dongshigu Village. Chen and his wife were reportedly beaten shortly after a human rights group released a video of their home under intense police surveillance in February 2011.

Chen's case received sustained international attention, with the U.S. State Department, the British Foreign Secretary, Human Rights Watch, and Amnesty International issuing appeals for his release; the latter group designated him a prisoner of conscience. Chen won the laureate of Ramon in 2006, is a 2007 laureate of the Ramon Magsaysay Award and in 2006 was named to the Time 100.

In April 2012 Chen escaped his house arrest and fled to the Embassy of the United States, Beijing. After negotiations with the Chinese government, he left the embassy for medical treatment in early May 2012, and it was reported that China would consider allowing him to travel to the United States to study. On May 19, 2012, Chen, his wife, and his two children were granted U.S. visas and departed Beijing for New York City. In October 2013, Chen accepted a position with the conservative research group Witherspoon Institute, and a position at the Catholic University of America.

== Early life and family ==
Chen is the youngest of five brothers of a peasant family from the village of Dongshigu, Yinan County, Linyi, southern Shandong Province, approximately 200 kilometres (120 mi) from the city of Jinan. When Chen was about six months old, he lost his sight due to a fever that destroyed his optical nerves. In an interview for the New York Review of Books, Chen said that although his family did not identify with an organized religion, his upbringing was informed by a "traditional belief in virtue that's present in Chinese culture—that might have some Buddhist content, but not necessarily that one believes in Buddhism." His village was poor, with many families living at a subsistence level. "When I went to school I'd be happy if I just got enough to eat", he recalled.

Chen's father worked as an instructor at a Chinese Communist Party (CCP) school, earning the equivalent of about $60 annually. When Chen was a child, his father would read literary works aloud to him, and reportedly helped impart to his son an appreciation of the values of democracy and freedom. In 1991, Chen's father gave him a copy of "The Law Protecting the Disabled", which elaborated on the legal rights and protections in place for disabled persons in the PRC.

In 1989 at the age of 18 Chen began attending school as a grade one student at the Elementary School for the Blind in Linyi city. In 1994, he enrolled at the Qingdao High School for the Blind, where he studied until 1998. He had already begun developing an interest in law, and would often ask his brothers to read legal texts to him. He earned a position at the Nanjing University of Traditional Chinese Medicine in 1998 but because his family was poor, they had to borrow $340 to cover tuition costs. They still fell short of the required $400 and university authorities reportedly had to be pleaded with before allowing Chen to enroll. He studied in Nanjing from 1998 to 2001, specializing in acupuncture and massage—the only programs available to the blind. Chen also audited legal courses, gaining a sufficient understanding of the law to allow him to aid his fellow villagers when they sought his assistance. After graduation he returned to his home region and found a job as a masseur in the hospital of Yinan County.

Chen met his wife, Yuan Weijing, in 2001, after listening to a radio talk show. Yuan had called into the show to discuss her difficulties in landing a job after graduating from the foreign department of Shandong's Chemistry Institute. Chen, who listened to the program, later contacted Yuan and relayed his own story of hardship as a blind man living on just 400 Yuan per year. Yuan was moved by the exchange, and later that year, she traveled to Chen's village to meet him. The couple eloped in 2003. Their son, Chen Kerui, was born later that year. In 2005 they had a second child—a daughter named Chen Kesi—in violation of China's one-child policy. Yuan, who had been working as an English teacher at the time of the marriage, left her job in 2003 in order to assist her husband in his legal work.

== Activism ==
Chen first petitioned authorities in 1996, when he traveled to Beijing to complain about taxes that were incorrectly being levied on his family (people with disabilities, such as Chen, are supposed to be exempt from taxation and fees). The complaint was successful, and Chen began petitioning for other individuals with disabilities. With funding from a British foundation, Chen became an outspoken activist for disability rights within the China Law Society. His reputation as a disability rights advocate was solidified when agreed to advocate for an elderly blind couple whose grandchildren had paralysis. The family had been paying all of the regular taxes and fees, but Chen believed that, under the law, the family should have received government assistance and exemption from taxation. When the case went to court, blind citizens from surrounding counties were in attendance as a show of solidarity. The case was successful, and the outcome became well known.

In 1997 the leaders of Chen's village began implementing a land use plan that gave authorities control over 60 percent of land, which they then rented out at high cost to the villages. The plan, known as the "two-field system", was a major source of enrichment for the local government. While studying in Nanjing the following year, however, Chen learned that the program was illegal, and he petitioned central authorities in Beijing to end the system, thereby irritating local officials.

In 2000 Chen returned from his studies in Nanjing to his village of Dongshigu in an effort to confront environmental pollution. A paper mill constructed in 1988 had been dumping toxic wastewater into the Meng River, destroying crops and harming wildlife. The chemicals also reportedly caused skin and digestive problems among villagers living downstream from the mill. Chen organized villagers in his hometown and 78 other villages to petition against the mill. The effort was successful, and resulted in the suspension of the paper mill. In addition, Chen contacted the British embassy in Beijing, informing them of the situation and requesting funding for a well to supply clean water to locals. The British government responded by providing £15,000 towards a deep water well, irrigation systems and water pipelines.

In March 2004 more than 300 residents from Chen's village of Dongshigu filed a petition to the village government demanding that they release the village accounts—which hadn't been made public for over ten years—and address the issue of illegal land requisitions. When village authorities failed to respond, villagers escalated their appeals to the township, county and municipal governments, still without response. Village authorities then began to publicly threaten villagers. In November 2004, Chen acted on behalf of villagers to file a lawsuit in the Qi'nan County Court against the local Public Security Bureau for negligence. The case was accepted, and proceedings began in early 2005.

In 2005 Chen spent several months surveying residents of Shandong Province, collecting accounts of forced, late-term abortions and forced sterilization of women who stood in violation of China's one-child policy. His survey was based in Linyi and included surrounding rural suburbs. Chen later recalled that his survey would have been significantly larger in scope were he not limited by a lack of financial resources.

Though Chinese central authorities have sought to curb the coercive enforcement of the one-child policy since 1990 by replacing measures such as forced abortions and sterilizations with a system of financial incentives and fines, Chen found that coercive practices remained widespread, and he documented numerous cases of abuse. One of the women he interviewed in Maxiagou village, 36-year-old Feng Zhongxia, said that local officials detained and beat her relatives, and indicated they would not be released until she turned herself in and submitted to a forced abortion. She said she was later subjected to forced sterilization. Chen also solicited the help of prominent legal scholar Teng Biao, who conducted his own interviews in Linyi. Teng and Chen later released a report claiming that an estimated 130,000 residents in the city had been forced into 'study sessions' for refusing abortions or violating the one-child policy; residents would be held for days or weeks in the study sessions, and were allegedly beaten.

In 2005 Chen filed a class-action lawsuit on behalf of women from Linyi against the city's family planning staff. And in June, he traveled to Beijing to file the complaint and meet with foreign reporters to publicize the case. Although there had been prior instances of Chinese citizens filing complaints about abuses under the one-child policy, Chen's initiative was the first class-action lawsuit to challenge its implementation.

Although the suit he filed was rejected, the case garnered international media attention. Responding to questions about Chen's allegation, a senior official with the National Population and Family Planning Commission told The Washington Post that the practice of forced abortions and sterilizations was "definitely illegal", and indicated that the complaints were being investigated. "If the Linyi complaints are true, or even partly true, it's because local officials do not understand the new demands of the Chinese leadership regarding family planning work", said the official. In September 2005, the commission announced that several Linyi officials had been detained. But local authorities in Linyi retaliated against Chen, placing him under house arrest in September 2005 and embarking on a campaign to undermine his reputation; the Linyi officials portrayed him as working for "foreign anti-China forces", pointing out that he had received foreign funding for his advocacy on behalf of disabled people.

== Detention and trial ==
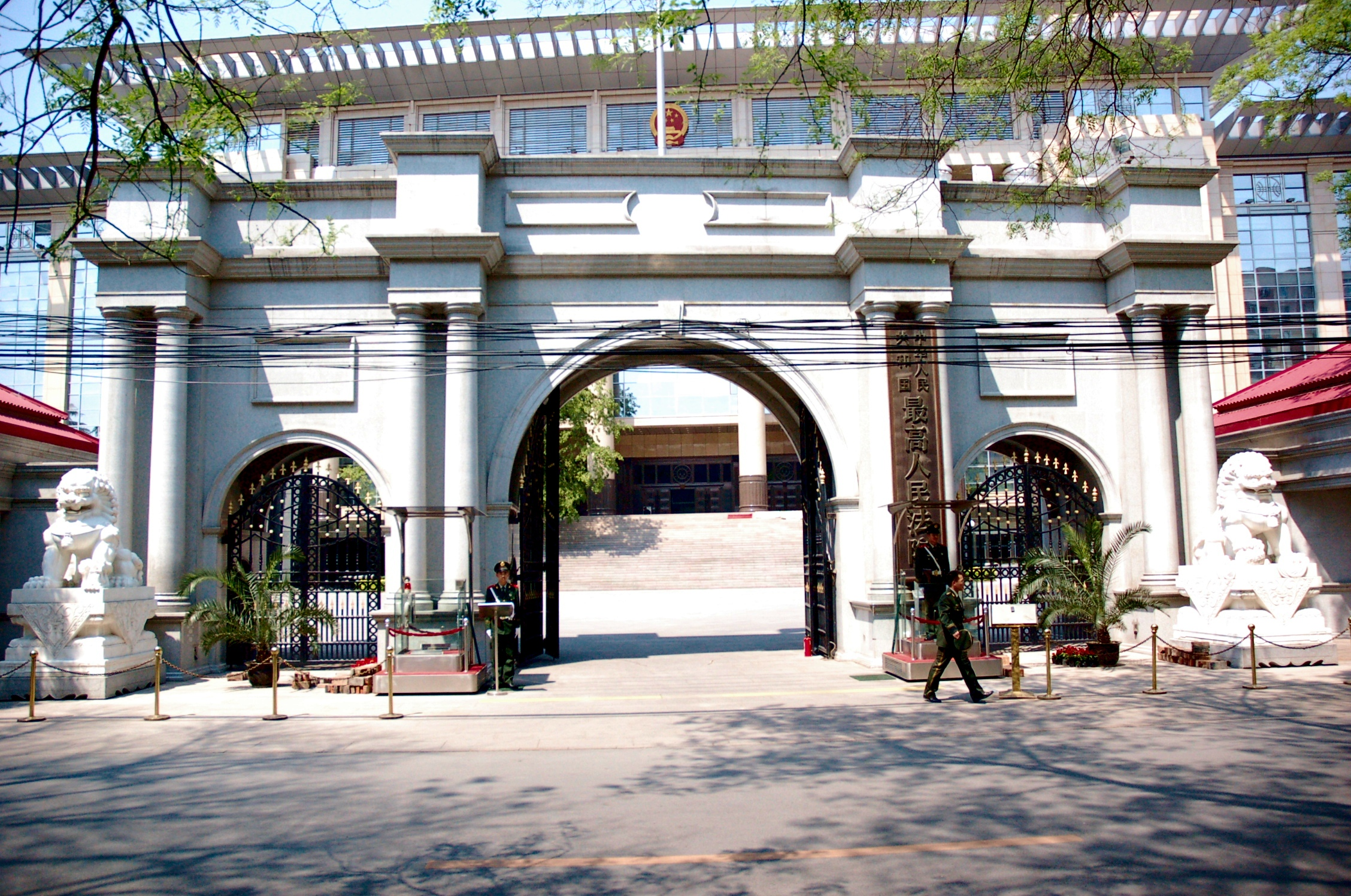
Main gate Supreme People's Court, Beijing

On September 7, 2005 while Chen was in Beijing to publicize his class action lawsuit against the Linyi city family planning staff, he was reportedly abducted by security agents from Linyi and held for 38 hours. Recounting the incident to foreign journalists, Chen said that authorities threatened to levy criminal charges against him for providing state secrets or intelligence to foreign organizations. After Chen refused negotiations with local officials to cease his activism, Linyi authorities placed him under effective house arrest beginning in September 2005. When he attempted to escape in October, he was beaten.

Xinhua, the news agency of the Chinese government, stated that on February 5, 2006, Chen instigated others "to damage and smash cars belonging to the Shuanghou Police Station and the town government" as well as attack local government officials. Time reported that witnesses to Chen's protest disputed the government's version of events, and his lawyers argued that it was unlikely he could have committed the crimes due to his constant surveillance by police. Chen was removed from his house in March 2006 and was formally detained in June 2006 by Yinan County officials. He was scheduled to stand trial on July 17, 2006 on charges of destruction of property and assembling a crowd to disrupt traffic, but this was delayed at the request of the prosecution. According to Radio Free Asia and Chinese Human Rights Defenders, the prosecution delayed the trial because a crowd of Chen supporters gathered outside the courthouse. With only a few days' notice, authorities rescheduled Chen's trial for August 18, 2006.

On the eve of his trial, all three of his lawyers, including Xu Zhiyong of the Yitong Law Firm, were detained by Yinan police; two were released after being questioned. Neither Chen's lawyers nor his wife were allowed in the courtroom for the trial. Authorities appointed their own public defender for Chen just before the trial began. The trial lasted only two hours. On August 24, 2006, Chen was sentenced to four years and three months for "damaging property and organizing a mob to disturb traffic".

As a result of Chen's trial, British foreign secretary Margaret Beckett selected his case for the cover of the British government's 2006 human rights report, stating concern over the handling of Chen's case and calling for the Chinese government "to prove its commitment to building rule of law". A columnist for The Globe and Mail also criticized the verdict, writing that "Even assuming [Chen] did damage 'doors and windows,' as well as cars, and interrupt traffic for three hours, it is difficult to argue a four-year prison sentence is somehow proportionate to the offence."

On November 30, 2006 Yinan County court upheld Chen's sentence, and on January 12, 2007, the Linyi Intermediate Court in Shandong Province rejected his final appeal. The same court had overturned his original conviction in December 2006, citing lack of evidence. However, Chen was convicted in a second trial on identical charges and given an identical sentence by the Yinan court. Following the trial, Amnesty International declared him to be a prisoner of conscience, "jailed solely for his peaceful activities in defence of human rights".

== House arrest ==
After his release from prison in 2010, Chen was placed under house arrest against Chinese law, and was closely monitored by security forces. Legally, he was proclaimed by the government to be a free man, but in reality the local government offered no explanation for the hundreds of unidentified agents monitoring his house and preventing visitors or escape.

He and his wife attempted to communicate with the outside world via video tape and letters. Letters described beatings Chen and his wife were subjected to, seizure of documents and communication devices, cutting off of electric power to their residence, and placing of metal sheets over the windows of their house. Harassment of Chen's family continued throughout his house arrest, and extended to Chen's six-year-old daughter, who was briefly banned from attending school and had her toys confiscated by guards, and to Chen's mother, who was harassed while working in the fields. Authorities reportedly told Chen that they had spent 60 million yuan ($9.5 million) to keep him under house arrest.

In 2011 The New York Times reported that a number of supporters and admirers had attempted to penetrate the security monitoring Chen's home, but were unsuccessful. In some instances, his supporters were pummeled, beaten, or robbed by security agents. U.S. congressman Chris Smith attempted to visit Chen in November 2011, but was not granted permission. U.S. secretary of state Hillary Clinton described the U.S. government as "alarmed" by Chen's continued detention and called on China "to embrace a different path". Human Rights Watch described his house arrest as "unlawful" and called on authorities to give Chen his freedom.

In December 2011 actor Christian Bale attempted to visit Chen along with a CNN crew, but was punched, shoved, and denied access by Chinese security guards. Bale later stated that he had wanted "to meet the man, shake his hand and say what an inspiration he is." Video footage also showed Bale and the CNN crew having stones thrown at them, and being pursued in their minivan for more than 40 minutes.

== Escape and emigration ==
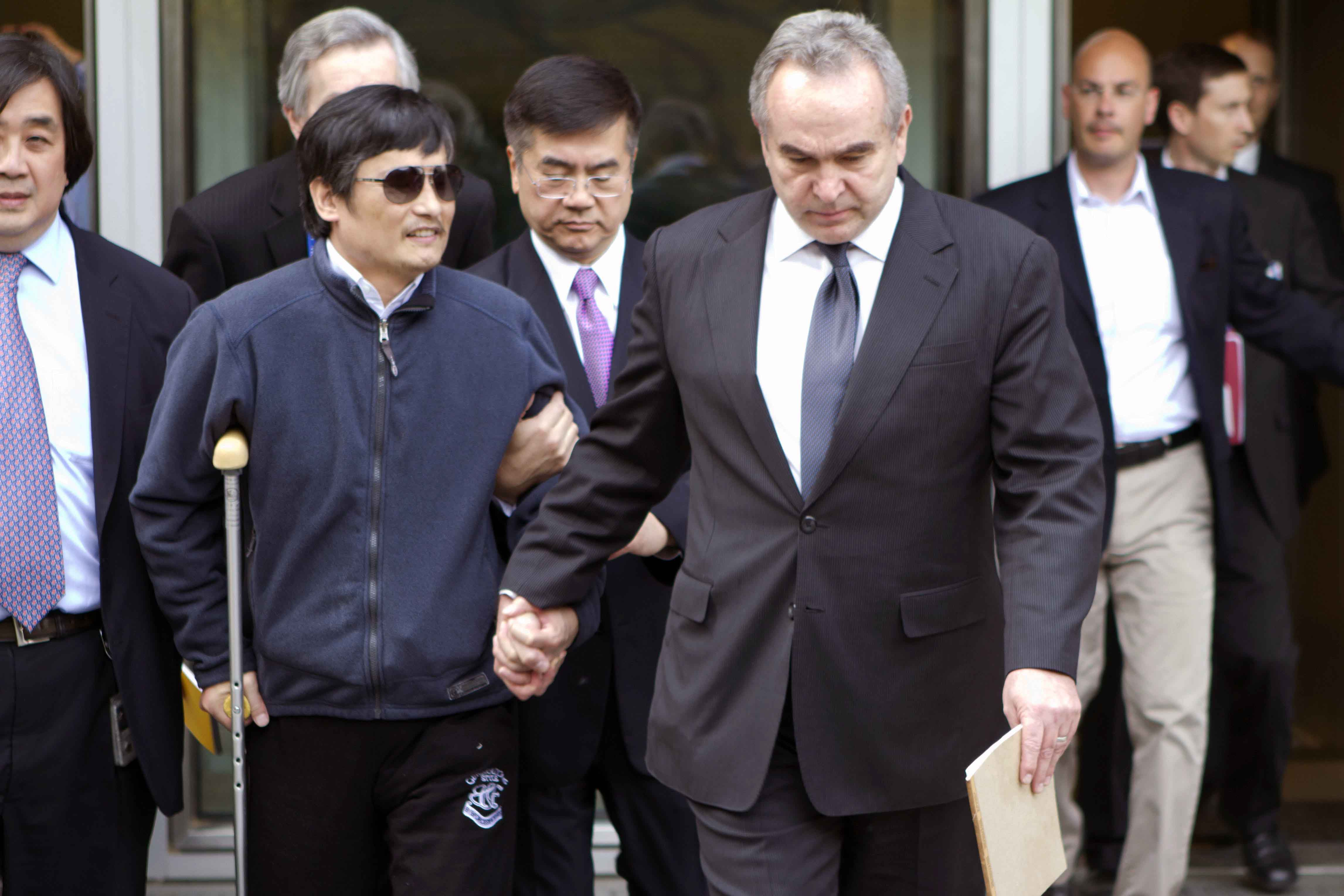
Chen (left) with Gary Locke (center) and Kurt M. Campbell (right) at the U.S. Embassy in Beijing on 1 May 2012

On April 22, 2012, Chen escaped from house arrest. Chen's fellow activist Hu Jia stated that Chen had been planning escape for a long time, and had previously attempted to dig a tunnel for escape. In the weeks leading up to his escape, Chen gave his guards the impression that he was ill in bed, and stopped appearing outside the house, which allowed him several days before any absence would be discovered. Under cover of darkness and with the help of his wife, Chen climbed over the wall around his house, breaking his foot in the process.

When he came upon the Meng River, he found it to be guarded, but crossed anyway and was not stopped; he later stated that he believed the guards had been asleep. Though he recollected his immediate surroundings from his childhood explorations, he eventually passed into less familiar territory; he later told his supporters that he fell more than 200 times during his escape. Communicating with a network of activists via a cell phone, he reached a pre-determined rendezvous point where He Peirong, an English teacher and activist, was waiting for him. A chain of human rights activists then escorted him to Beijing. Several of the activists reported to be involved were detained or disappeared in the days following the announcement of Chen's escape.

Chen was given refuge at the U.S. Embassy in Beijing, though the embassy initially declined to confirm or deny reports that they were sheltering him. The embassy later said they had accepted Chen on humanitarian grounds and offered him medical assistance. On April 27, Chen appeared in an internet video in which he expressed his concern that the authorities would carry out "insane retribution" on his family and made three demands of Premier Wen Jiabao: 1) that local officials who allegedly assaulted his family be prosecuted; 2) that his family's safety be guaranteed; and 3) that the Chinese government prosecute corruption cases under the law.

The New York Times described the situation as a "diplomatic quandary" at a time when the U.S. was seeking to improve relations with China and seeks its support with respect to crises in Iran, Sudan, Syria, and North Korea. BBC News described Chen's escape as coming at "an unwelcome time for China's leaders", who were still dealing with a high-profile corruption scandal that resulted in the removal of politburo member Bo Xilai. Within twenty-four hours, Chen's name as well as the phrases "CGC" and "the blind man" had been blocked by Chinese online censors in an effort to quell Internet discussion of the case. On the day Chen announced his escape, Chinese state media did not carry "a single line of news" referring to it. The New York Times wrote that news of the escape "electrified China's rights activists".

=== Negotiations and exit from U.S. embassy ===
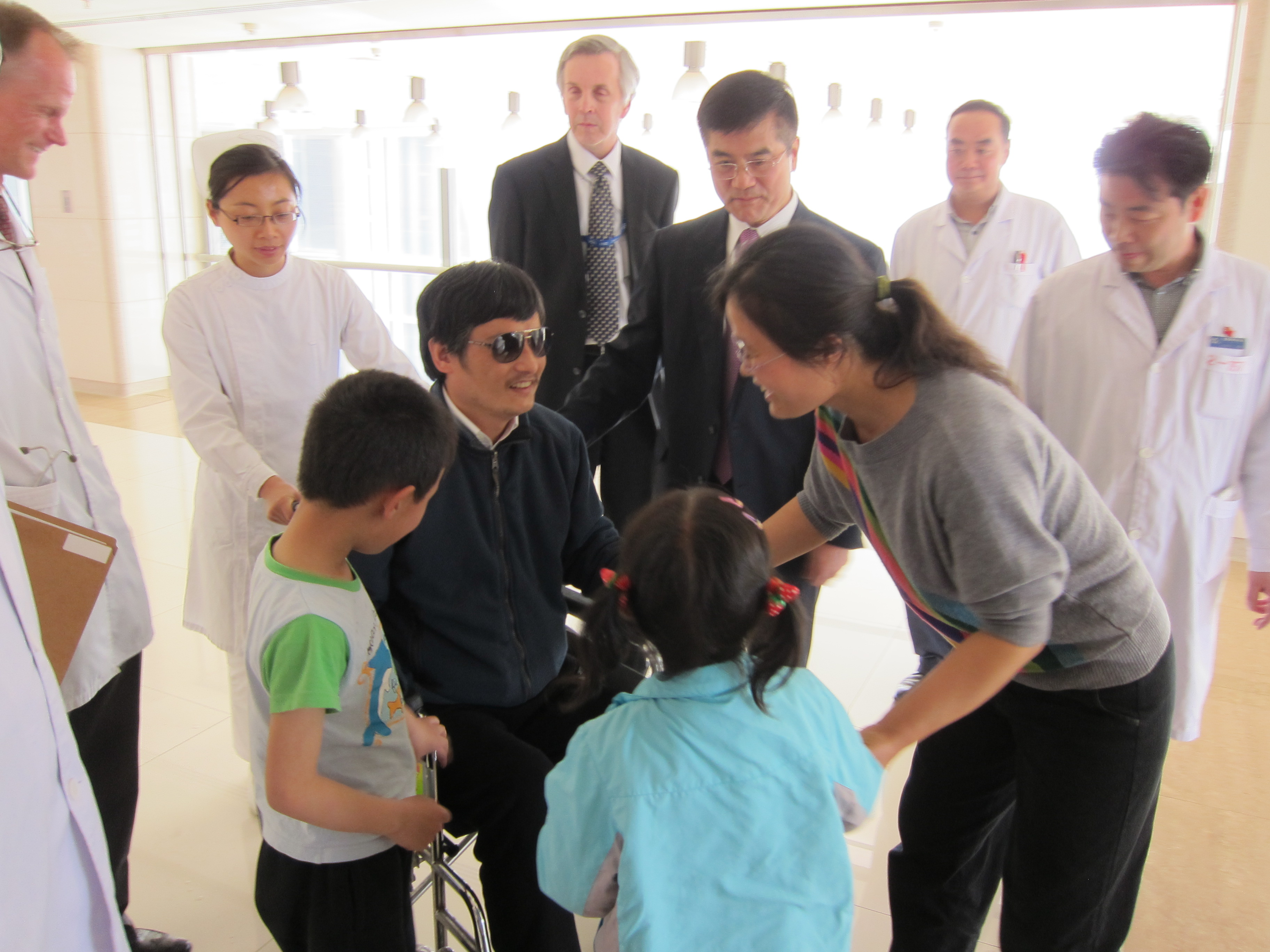
Chen Guangcheng with his family at a hospital in Beijing, China, on May 2, 2012

Kurt M. Campbell, an assistant secretary of state, quietly arrived in Beijing on April 29 for negotiations with representatives of China's Ministry of Foreign Affairs. After several days of media speculation as to his whereabouts, Chen was confirmed on 2 May to have been under U.S. diplomatic protection at the embassy.

According to embassy representatives, the agreement brokered with Chinese authorities provided that Chen would be freed from soft detention, relocated, and be permitted to finish his legal education at one of several law schools in China. Chinese officials also promised to investigate "extra-legal activities" taken by Shandong province authorities against Chen and his family. Chen left the embassy of his own accord on May 2, was reunited with his family, and admitted to Beijing's Chaoyang Hospital for medical treatment.

During the initial negotiations in the U.S. embassy, Chen did not request asylum in the United States or considered leaving China, but instead demanded to remain there as a free man. However, soon after leaving the embassy, Chen feared that Chinese authorities would renege on their promises or take punitive actions against his family members. While in the hospital, Chinese security personnel barred U.S. diplomatic staff from meeting with him. Rumors emerged that Chinese officials had coerced Chen into leaving the embassy by threatening his family. U.S. negotiators stated that while in the embassy, Chen had been told by Chinese officials that if he sought asylum in the United States, his wife and daughter would likely remain under house arrest in Shandong. However, they maintained that they had not heard of the threats from local officials that his family would be beaten, and that they had not communicated such a message to Chen. On May 3, Chen clarified to the BBC that he had become aware of the threats against his family after leaving the embassy, and at that point changed his mind about wishing to stay in China.

On May 2, a spokesperson of China's Ministry of Foreign Affairs demanded that the U.S. apologize for the Chen incident, investigate its acts and never interfere in China's domestic matters in such a way again. In an editorial on May 4, Beijing Daily described Chen as "a tool and a pawn for American politicians to denigrate China". The daily also accused US ambassador Gary Locke of stirring up trouble by sheltering Chen, and questioned Locke's motives.

On May 4, after Chen made clear his desire to leave China for the United States, a Chinese foreign ministry spokesperson indicated that, if he wished to study abroad, he could "apply through normal channels to the relevant departments in accordance with the law, just like any other Chinese citizen." On the same day, Chen was offered a visiting scholar position at New York University. On May 19, Chen, his wife, and his two children, having been granted U.S. visas, departed Beijing on a commercial flight for Newark, New Jersey.

=== Treatment of family and associates ===
While Chen was living under house arrest, several of his family members also reportedly faced harassment and confinement by authorities. His elderly mother, Wang Jinxiang, recalled being continuously followed by three security agents. The BBC reported in May 2012 that she remained under house arrest. Before leaving China in the spring of 2012, Chen expressed concern that his relatives and other activists who had helped him evade capture would be punished by Chinese officials after his departure.

On April 27, 2012 soon after Chen escaped house arrest, plainclothes security agents forced entry into the home of his eldest brother, Chen Guangfu. Believing that the elder brother had information on Chen's escape, police took him to a police station for interrogation, and reportedly chained his feet, slapped him, and struck him with a belt. Police officers then allegedly returned to the family's home and proceeded to beat Guangfu's wife and son. His son, Chen Kegui, pulled a knife and slashed at three of the officers, causing minor injuries. He was taken into custody and faces criminal charges for attempted murder. On May 24, it was reported that Chen Guangfu had escaped to Beijing from his guarded village to advocate on behalf of his son. In November 2012, Chen Kegui was sentenced to more than three years in prison.

On November 4, 2013 Chen Guangfu said he would fly to New York City with his mother two days later for a reunion with his brother Chen Guangcheng.

== In the United States ==
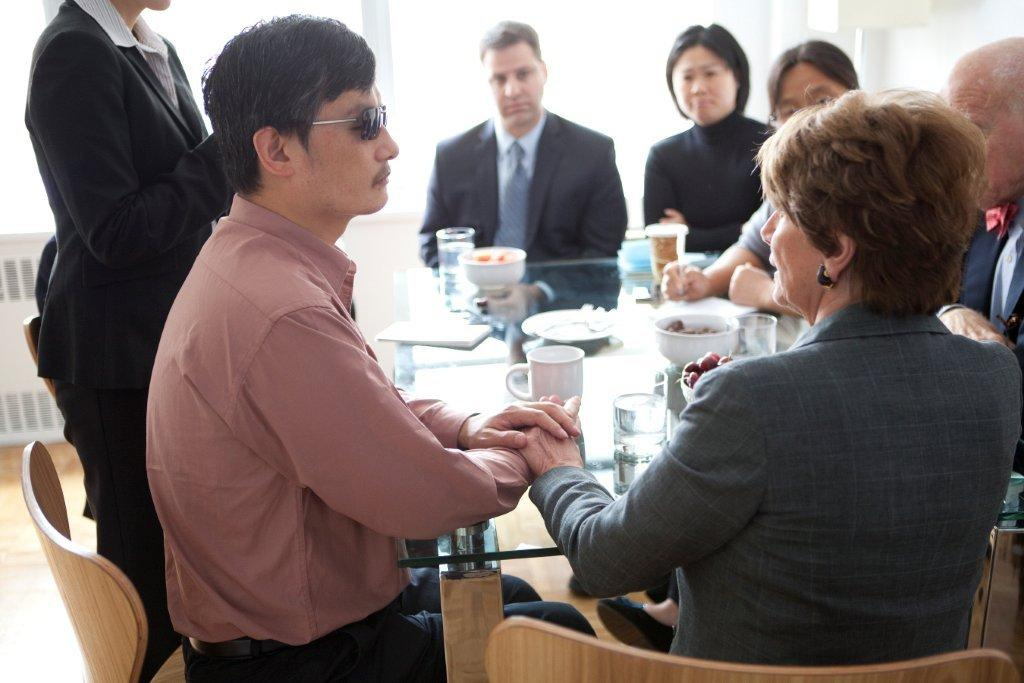
House Minority Nancy Pelosi meets with Chen Guangcheng in New York in June 2012

Following his arrival in the U.S., Chen, his wife, and the couple's two children settled in a housing complex for students and faculty of New York University, located in Greenwich Village. He reportedly began studying English for two hours per day, in addition to having regular meetings with American legal scholars. His memoir, The Barefoot Lawyer, was published in March 2015 by Henry Holt and Company.

On May 29, 2012 Chen published an editorial in The New York Times criticizing the Chinese government and the CCP for the "lawless punishment inflicted on (himself) and (his) family over the past seven years". He said that "those who handled my case were able to openly flout the nation's laws in many ways for many years." In an April 2013 testimony before the House Foreign Affairs Committee, Chen said that Chinese authorities had failed to deliver on promises to investigate allegations of mistreatment against him and his family. Chen issued a statement in June saying NYU is forcing him to leave at the end of June because of pressure from the Chinese government. This claim was denied by the university, as well as by professor Jerome A. Cohen, Chen's mentor who arranged for his placement at NYU. Despite these denials, his departure followed within days of NYU's agreement with the Chinese authorities to open the NYU Shanghai campus. Chen's close association with conservative Christian and anti-abortion figures since coming to the United States, including representative Chris Smith, pastor Bob Fu, and media consultant Mark Corallo, has concerned old supporters like Cohen.

In October 2013 Chen accepted an offer from the Witherspoon Institute in Princeton, New Jersey. Chen became a Distinguished Senior Fellow in Human Rights at the Witherspoon Institute, as well as a visiting fellow of the Institute for Policy Research and Catholic Studies at the Catholic University of America and a Senior Distinguished Advisor to the Lantos Foundation for Human Rights and Justice.

On October 16, 2013 Chen made his first public appearance in his role as a Distinguished Senior Fellow at the Witherspoon Institute. He delivered a public lecture at Princeton University entitled "China and the World in the 21st Century: The Next Human Rights Revolution", which was co-sponsored by the Witherspoon Institute and the James Madison Program in American Ideals and Institutions. The text of Chen's speech, translated into English, was then published online. In the speech, Chen called on the American people to support the Chinese people by fighting against the oppressive Communist government of China. He reminded the audience that even small actions undertaken in defense of human rights can have a large impact, because "Every person has infinite strength. Every action has an important impact. We must believe in the value of our own actions".

In August 2020 Chen spoke at the 2020 Republican National Convention. During his speech, Chen stated "We need to support, vote, and fight for President Trump."

In 2021 Chen naturalized as a US citizen.

== Memoirs ==
In 2015 Henry Holt and Company published Chen's memoirs The Barefoot Lawyer: A Blind Man's Fight for Justice and Freedom in China.

== Awards and recognition ==
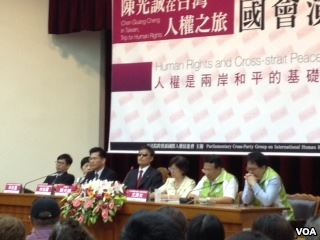
Chen in Legislative Yuan, Taiwan.

Chen began attracting international media attention for his civil rights activism in the early 2000s. In March 2002, Newsweek magazine ran a cover story on Chen and the "barefoot lawyer" movement in China, detailing his advocacy on behalf of villagers and disabled people. His profile rose further in 2005 when he filed a landmark class-action suit taking on abuses of the one-child policy. In 2006, Chen Guangcheng was named one of the Time 100, Time's annual list of "100 men and women whose power, talent or moral example is transforming our world". The citation stated, "He may have lost his sight as a child, but Chen Guangcheng's legal vision has helped illuminate the plight of thousands of Chinese villagers."

In 2007, Chen won the Ramon Magsaysay Award while still in detention. The award, often called the "Asian Nobel Prize", was bestowed for "his irrepressible passion for justice in leading ordinary Chinese citizens to assert their legitimate rights under the law". According to AIDS activist Hu Jia, Chen's wife Yuan Weijing attempted to attend the Magsaysay Award ceremony on her husband's behalf, her passport was revoked and her mobile phone was confiscated by Chinese authorities at Beijing Capital International Airport.

The National Endowment for Democracy honored Chen with the 2008 Democracy Award. Chen was one of seven Chinese lawyers and civil rights activists to be named as recipients of the award.

In 2012, Chen was chosen as the recipient of the Human Rights Award from the New York-based NGO Human Rights First. In explaining the choice, the organization's president Elisa Massimino stated, "Mr. Chen's activism has reignited an international conversation about the need to protect human rights lawyers around the world who face great danger for their courageous work." In 2014 he received the Geneva Summit Courage Award.

On May 13, 2023, Chen was awarded an honorary Doctor of Laws degree by the Institute of World Politics.
