= Lecture room (disambiguation) =

A Lecture room is a room where people listen to lectures.

Lecture room may also refer to:

- Lecture Room, a program of China Central Television
- The Lecture Room, segment of AKB48 Show!

== See also ==
- Lecture hall
