= Meng Man =

Chinese historian

- 蒙曼
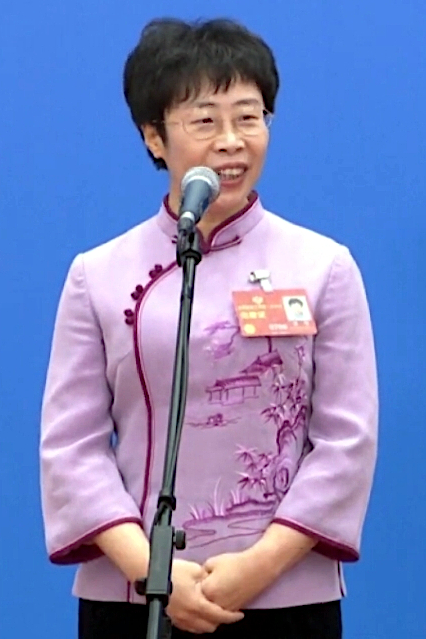
- Meng in 2023
- Born: January 28, 1975 (age 51); Pingquan, Hebei, China
- Occupations: Scholar, writer
- Known for: Lecturing on Lecture Room

Academic background
- Education: Minzu University of China; Peking University

Academic work
- Discipline: History
- Sub-discipline: History of Sui; History of Tang

Meng Man (Chinese: 蒙曼; pinyin: Méng Màn; born 28 January 1975) is a Chinese scholar and a professor at the College of History and Culture, Minzu University of China. She is best known for conducting lecture series about Chinese literature on the CCTV-10 television programme Lecture Room.

== Biography ==
Meng was born in 1975 in Pingquan, Chengde, Hebei province, to an ethnic Manchu family. Her parents graduated from Tianjin Foreign Studies University. Her elder aunt was a university student in the 1950s and became the first headmistress in her hometown.

She entered the Minzu University of China in September 1992, majoring in history, where she graduated in July 1999. Two months later, she was accepted to Peking University, where she completed her doctor's degree in history under the direction of Rong Xinjiang (荣新江). After graduation, she taught there.

In November 2007, she regularly gave lectures on Wu Zetian on the television programme Lecture Room shown on CCTV-10. Since then, she has conducted four lecture series–Wu Zetian, Princess Taiping (2008), The Song of Everlasting Sorrow (2009), The Wonderful Sui Dynasty (2010) and Emperor Xuanzong and Yang Guifei (2013).

In January 2017, she became a judge at the China Central Television (CCTV) program Chinese Poetry Congress. On June 23, she was elected a delegate to the 19th National Congress of the Chinese Communist Party.

== Works ==
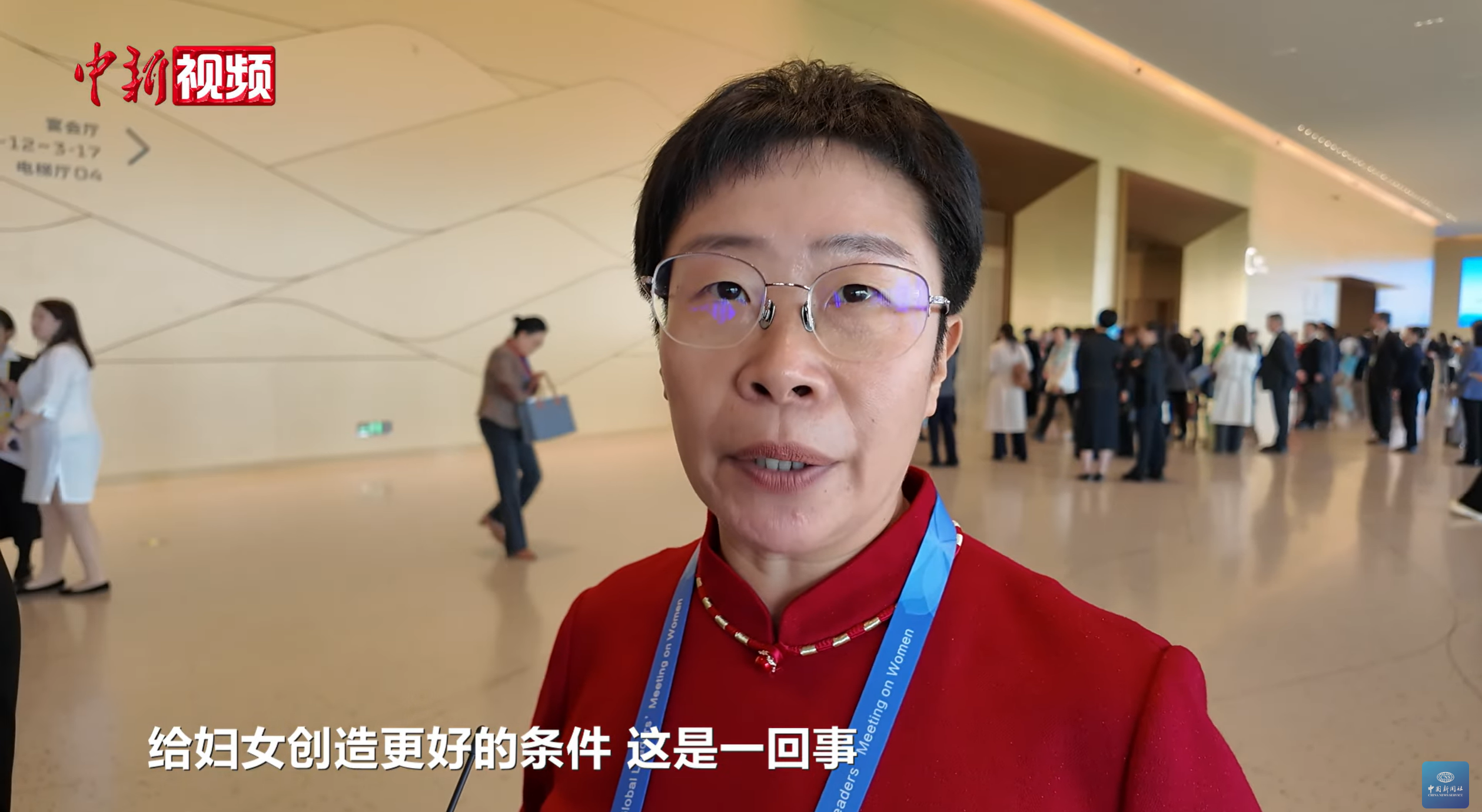
Meng Man at 2025 Global Leaders' Meeting on Women

- 蒙曼说唐：长恨歌 [Meng Man commentary the Tang Dynasty: The Song of Everlasting Sorrow] (in Chinese). Xi'an, Shaanxi: Shaanxi Normal University Press. 2010. ISBN 9787561349533.
- Meng Man shuo Tang. Tang xuan zong 蒙曼说唐：唐玄宗 [Meng Man commentary the Tang Dynasty: Emperor Xuanzong] (in Chinese). Xi'an, Shaanxi: Shaanxi Normal University Press. 2013. ISBN 9787561366684.
- 武则天 [Wu Zetian] (in Chinese). Nanning, Guangxi: Guangxi Normal University. 2015. ISBN 9787549564132.
- 太平公主和她的时代 [Princess Taiping and Her Age] (in Chinese). Xinxing Press. 2016. ISBN 9787513321556.
- 蒙曼说隋：隋文帝杨坚（上） [Meng Man commentary the Sui Dynasty: Emperor Wen of Sui (Volume 1)] (in Chinese). Nanchang, Jiangxi: Jiangxi People's Publishing House. 2011. ISBN 9787210048459.
- 蒙曼说隋：隋文帝杨坚（下） [Meng Man commentary the Sui Dynasty: Emperor Wen of Sui (Volume 2)] (in Chinese). Nanchang, Jiangxi: Jiangxi People's Publishing House. 2011. ISBN 9787210048442.
- 蒙曼说隋：隋炀帝杨广（上） [Meng Man commentary the Sui Dynasty: Emperor Yang of Sui (Volume 1)] (in Chinese). Wuhan, Hubei: Changjiang Literature & Art Press. 2012. ISBN 9787535457653.
- 蒙曼说隋：隋炀帝杨广（下） [Meng Man commentary the Sui Dynasty: Emperor Yang of Sui (Volume 2)] (in Chinese). Wuhan, Hubei: Changjiang Literature & Art Press. 2012. ISBN 9787535457646.
