= Zhang Tengyue =

Zhang Tengyue (Chinese: 张腾岳; pinyin: Zhāng Téngyuè, born November 8, 1975) is a Chinese TV host of CCTV-10's 9 Science.

== Biography ==
Zhang Tengyue received his A.B. degree from Beijing Broadcasting Institute. After graduation, he joined China Central Television and became the popular host of Approaching Science.
