= He Peirong (activist) =

- Citizenship: Chinese
- Occupation: English Teacher
- Known for: activism on behalf of rural poor
- Call sign: Pearl

He Peirong (Chinese: 何培蓉; pinyin: Hé Péiróng) is an English teacher and activist best known for aiding the blind lawyer activist Chen Guangcheng to escape to the U.S. Embassy in Beijing in April 2012.

A Chinese citizen from Nanjing of Jiangsu province in China, He Peirong is an outspoken activist who opposes alleged civil rights violations in China. Her profile rose significantly after her role in helping Chen Guangcheng escape. Peirong drove 20 hours to meet Chen as part of a larger effort to get Chen to the US Embassy.

== Detention and release ==
He Peirong was detained for about one week prior to being released.

== US congressional hearing ==
He Peirong's plight was on the agenda for a special US congressional hearing on May 3, 2012.

== See also ==
- Chen Guangcheng
- Weiquan movement
