= Dongshigu =

Village in Shandong, China

Dongshigu (Chinese: 东师古村) is a village in Yinan County, Linyi, Shandong, China. It is notable for being the home of Chinese civil rights activist Chen Guangcheng, who was held under house arrest in the village from 2010 to 2012, before he escaped to the US Embassy in Beijing.
