= Wang Liqun =

Chinese historian and professor

- 王立群
- Born: 1945 (age 80–81); Huoshan County, Anhui, China
- Occupation: Historian
- Known for: Lecturing on Lecture Room; Teaching in Henan University's School of Arts

Wang Liqun (Chinese: 王立群; pinyin: Wáng Lìqún; born 1945) is a Chinese historian and a professor in the School of Arts, Henan University. He is best known for conducting lecture series about Chinese history on the CCTV-10 television programme Lecture Room.

== Life ==
Wang was born in 1945 in Huoshan County, Anhui, but his ancestral home was in Xintai, Shandong. He moved to Kaifeng, Henan in 1953 and has been living there since. He took the Gaokao in 1965 and applied for Tsinghua University, but was declined due to his social status, then he worked as an elementary school teacher for 11 years. In 1979, after the end of Cultural Revolution and restoration of Gaokao, he successfully got admitted into Henan University, and later became a lecturer and then a professor in the School of Arts, Henan University. He is also a consultant in the China Shi Ji Research Association and the vice chairman of the Wen Xuan Society. He was a member of the 10th Henan Chinese People's Political Consultative Conference Provincial Committee.

In 2006, Wang received an invitation to be a lecturer on the television programme Lecture Room shown on CCTV-10. Since then, he has conducted five lecture series—Xiang Yu, Empress Lü, Emperor Wu of Han, Qin Shi Huang, and Song of the Great Wind—on the history of the Qin and Han dynasties. He has received good reviews and awards for his lectures and works.
