= Yuan Tengfei =

Chinese writer and history teacher

Yuan Tengfei (simplified Chinese: 袁腾飞; traditional Chinese: 袁騰飛; pinyin: Yuán Téngfēi; born February 8, 1972, Beijing), is a historian and former history teacher in the People's Republic of China. In an article in The New York Times, Yuan claims that history textbooks in China included omissions because the ruling government fears challenges to its authority, illustrating this by comparing this to the USSR: "They didn't begin telling the truth in the Soviet Union until after it collapsed, did they?" He was a popular guest in Lecture Room of CCTV. Additionally, he released several books based on his history lectures in classrooms and on TV.

Yuan graduated from Capital Normal University with a major in Chinese history, and taught Chinese history in various Beijing high schools. He came to popular attention when videos of his history courses for Beijing cram school were posted online in 2008, which were made available behind the school's paywall. The videos were copied, presumably without any authorization, and posted to other free video-sharing websites.

Although Yuan is not a political dissident, his lectures on modern Chinese history present sensitive topics such as the Great Chinese Famine and the Cultural Revolution in details that are not ordinarily covered in the history curriculum in China. In particular, he is deeply critical of Mao Zedong and his policies. Yuan called Mao one of the "three great despots" of the 20th century, rivalled by only Hitler and Stalin. He also once called the Mao Zedong Mausoleum in Tiananmen Square "China's Yasukuni Shrine". His lectures on such topics became an object of government attention and attacks from leftist conservatives, including threats of lawsuits for defamation.

Yuan has quit teaching position and signed contract with TaixueTV, where he broadcasts many online videos about historical topics and travelling programs.

== Publications ==
- 《隐士与僧道》. 中国少年儿童出版社. 2001. ISBN 978-7-5007-5366-7.
- 《两宋风云》. 陕西师范大学出版社. July 2009. ISBN 978-7-5613-4724-9.
- 《历史是个什么玩意儿1 —— 袁腾飞说中国史上》History is just a game I —— Chinese History according to Yuan Tengfei, Part One. 上海锦绣文艺出版社. August 2009. ISBN 978-7-5452-0447-6.
- 《历史是个什么玩意儿2 —— 袁腾飞说中国史下》History is just a game II —— Chinese History according to Yuan Tengfei, Part Two. 花山文艺出版社. December 2009. ISBN 978-7-80755-720-3.
- 《历史是个什么玩意儿3 —— 袁腾飞说世界史上》History is just a game III —— World History according to Yuan Tengfei, Part One. 寧夏人民出版社. May 2010. ISBN 978-7-227-04474-1.
- 《历史是个什么玩意儿4 —— 袁腾飞说世界史下》History is just a game IV —— World History according to Yuan Tengfei, Part Two. 希望出版社. July 2010. ISBN 978-7-5379-4825-8.
- 《战争就是这么回事儿》. 湖南人民出版社. January 2013. ISBN 978-7-5438-8907-1.
