= House arrest =

Confinement of a person to their residence by law enforcement authorities

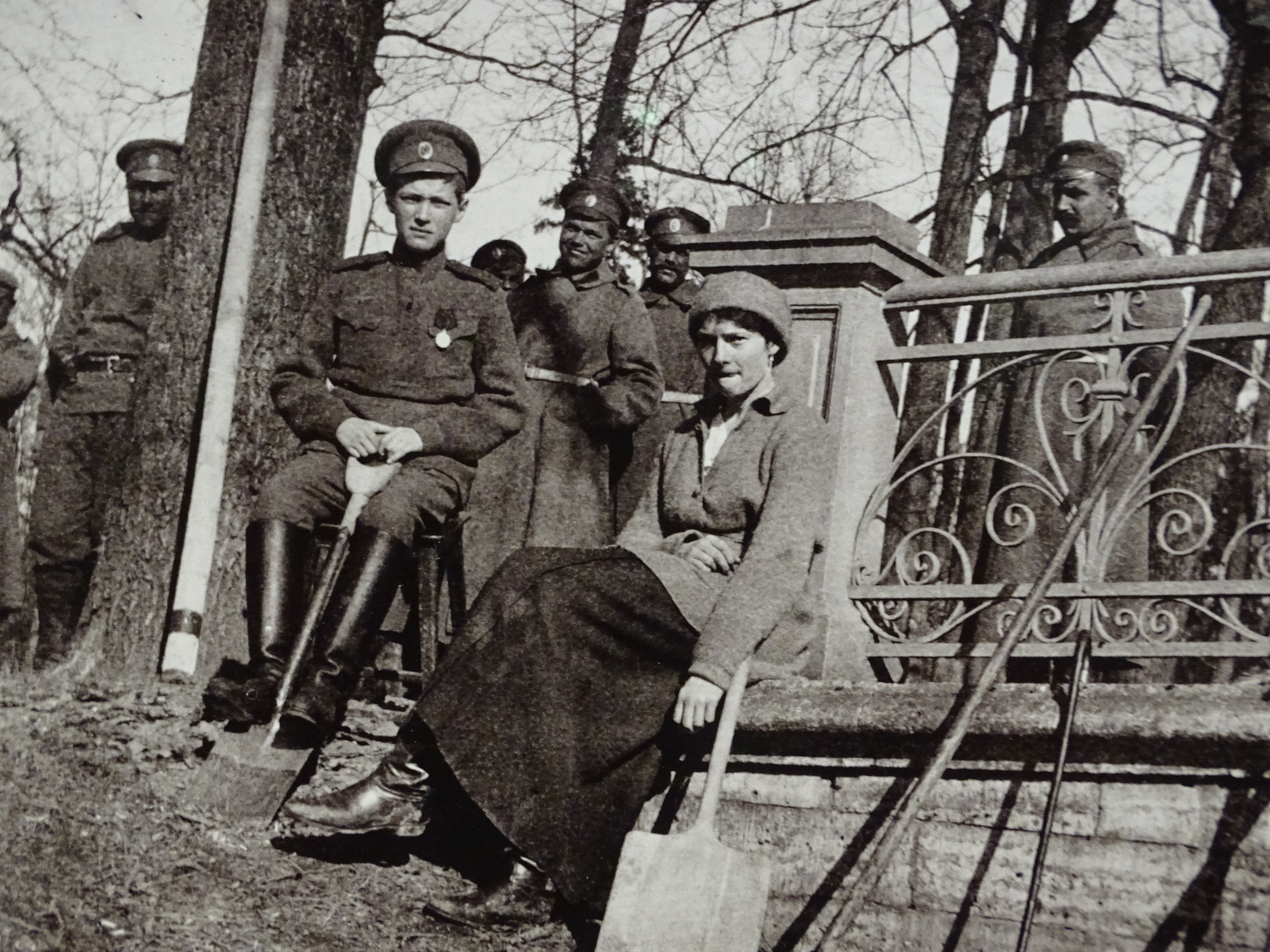
Alexei Nikolaevich and his sister Tatiana Nikolaevna surrounded by guards during their house arrest in Tsarskoye Selo, April 1917

House arrest (also called home confinement) is a legal measure where a person is required to remain at their residence under supervision, typically as an alternative to imprisonment. The person is confined by the authorities to their residence. Travel is usually restricted and may require prior approval.

Since the introduction of electronic tagging, a person under house arrest may be monitored electronically, and their movements are typically tracked. House arrest is also used in some cases for individuals convicted of minor offenses. In certain situations, such as in authoritarian regimes, house arrest may be used to restrict the freedom of political dissidents against political governments, sometimes limiting or monitoring their communication with the outside world. If electronic communication is allowed, conversations may be monitored. There is much criticism of the effectiveness of house arrest.

== History ==
Authorities have imposed sentences of home confinement, as an alternative to prison, as far back as the 17th century. Galileo was confined to his home following his second trial in 1633. Authorities often used house arrest to confine political leaders who were deposed in a coup d'état, but this method was not widely used to confine numerous common criminals. Over time, though, house arrest became more popular, especially as prisons and jails became overcrowded and expensive.

However, this method didn't become a widely used alternative to imprisonment in the United States and other Western countries until the 20th century, after it was introduced in the U.S. in 1984. Around this time, newly designed electronic monitoring devices made it more affordable and easier for corrections authorities to manage. Although Boston was using house arrest for a variety of arrangements, the first-ever court sentence of house arrest with an electronic bracelet was in 1983.

House arrest and electronic monitoring programs are among the most widely used alternatives to incarceration. It has been estimated that in 2005 roughly 20% of community-based supervision involved the use of electronic monitoring.

The COVID-19 pandemic led to an increase in the use of house arrest as well. To stop the spread of the virus in crowded prisons, many governments allowed people to serve their sentences at home instead. This was mostly done for non-violent offenders or people close to finishing their prison terms.

== Details ==
Home detention is an alternative to imprisonment; its goals are both to reduce recidivism and decrease the number of prisoners, thereby saving money for states and other jurisdictions. It is a corrective to mandatory sentencing laws that greatly increased the incarceration rates in the United States. It allows eligible offenders to retain or seek employment, maintain family relationships and responsibilities, and attend rehabilitative programs that contribute toward addressing the causes of their offending.

The terms of house arrest can differ, but most programs allow employed offenders to continue to work, and confine them to their residence only during non-working hours. Offenders are commonly allowed to leave their home for specific purposes; examples can include visits to the probation officer or police station, religious services, education, attorney visits, court appearances, and medical appointments. Many programs also allow the convict to leave their residence during regular, pre-approved times in order to carry out general household errands, such as food shopping and laundry. Offenders may have to respond to communications from a higher authority to verify that they are at home when required to be. Exceptions are often made to allow visitors to visit the offender.

The types of house arrest vary in severity according to the requirements of the court order. A curfew may restrict an offender to their house at certain times, usually during hours of darkness. "Home confinement" or detention requires an offender to remain at home at all times, apart from the above-mentioned exceptions.

The most serious level of house arrest is "home incarceration", under which an offender is restricted to their residence 24 hours a day, 7 days a week, except for court-approved treatment programs, court appearances, and medical appointments.

In some exceptional cases, it is possible for a person to be placed under house arrest without trial or legal representation, and subject to restrictions on their associates. In some countries, this type of detention without trial has been criticized for breaching the offender's human right to a fair trial. In countries with authoritarian systems of government, the government may use such measures to stifle dissent.

== Using technology for enforcement ==
In some countries, house arrest is enforced through the use of technology products or services. One method is an electronic sensor locked around the offender's ankle (technically called an ankle monitor, also referred to as a tether). The electronic sensor transmits an RF signal to a base handset. The base handset is connected to a police station or for-profit monitoring service.

If the offender goes too far from their home, the violation is recorded, and the police will be notified. To discourage tampering, many ankle monitors detect attempted removal. The monitoring service is often contracted out to private companies, which assign employees to electronically monitor many convicts simultaneously. If a violation occurs the unit signals the officer or officer in charge immediately, depending on the severity of the violation. The officer will either call or verify the participant's whereabouts. The monitoring service notifies a convict's probation officer. The electronic surveillance together with frequent contact with their probation officer and checks by the security guards provides for a secure environment.

Another method of ensuring house arrest compliance is achieved through the use of automated calling services that require no human contact to check on the offender. Random calls are made to the residence. The respondent's answer is recorded and compared automatically to the offender's voice pattern. Authorities are notified only if the call is not answered or if the recorded answer does not match the offender's voice pattern.

Electronic monitoring is considered a highly economical alternative to the cost of imprisoning offenders. In many states or jurisdictions, the convict is often required to pay for the monitoring as part of his or her sentence. However, it's important to recognize that "compared with non-custodial sanctions, incarceration appears to have a null or mildly criminogenic effect on future criminal behavior." This means that while house arrest can be a better option than prison, its effectiveness in preventing reoffending prisoners can vary from person to person.

== Notable instances ==
=== Algeria ===
- Ahmed Ben Bella, former president of Algeria, deposed by Houari Boumédiènne in 1965. He was held under house arrest before being exiled in 1980.

=== Argentina ===
- Jorge Videla, former dictator of Argentina (was held by house arrest only for a period)
- Cristina Fernández de Kirchner, former President of Argentina

=== Australia ===
- Derryn Hinch, New Zealand media personality based in Melbourne, Australia; he was placed under house arrest for five months for breaching gag orders by naming two sex offenders.

=== Brazil ===
- Jair Bolsonaro, former President of Brazil

=== Myanmar (Burma) ===
- Aung San Suu Kyi, winner of the 1991 Nobel Peace Prize and leader of her country's pro-democracy movement, was punished with house arrest for most of the period from July 1989 to November 2010. After being released from her initial confinement after six years in 1995, she was convicted again and imprisoned in 2000. Two years later, she was again released. She was convicted and jailed for the third time under house arrest for her criticism of the government following the infamous Depayin Massacre in 2003. After her 14th year of prison, she was released to her dilapidated home in Rangoonhe. She had to serve another 18 months in prison, convicted by a Burmese regional court in August 2009 after an American swam across Inya Lake to her house. The United Nations has declared all of her periods under house arrest as arbitrary and unjust. She was released on 13 November 2010. On 1 Feb 2021, she was deposed in the 2021 Myanmar coup d'état and detained, and has since at times been under house arrest and at times in conventional detention.
- Ne Win, former military commander of Burma from 1962. He was believed to be behind the coup d'état of 1988 which officially deposed him. Following his son-in-law's effort to regain power, Ne Win was sentenced to house arrest in 2001, serving until he died in December 2002.

=== Cambodia ===
- Pol Pot, former premier of Cambodia. He was placed under house arrest in 1998 by Ta Mok, a rival Khmer Rouge leader.

=== Chile ===
- On January 5, 2005, former dictator Augusto Pinochet was placed under house arrest by orders of the Supreme Court of Chile.

=== People's Republic of China (PRC) ===
The People's Republic of China continues to use soft detention, a traditional form of house arrest used by the Chinese Empire.

- Zhao Ziyang, purged General Secretary of the Chinese Communist Party, was put under house arrest for the last 16 years of his life after the 1989 Tiananmen Square protests and massacre. The Chinese Communist Party's Central Office approved all of his movements outside his home; he was restricted to quiet travel to different places inside China and traveling to play golf.
- Jiang Yanyong, physician who revealed SARS incident in China in 2003. He was put under house arrest after requesting the government to investigate the 1989 Tiananmen Square protests and massacre.
- Gendhun Choekyi Nyima, an alleged reincarnation or Tulku of the Gelug sect of Tibetan Buddhism was recognized by the present Dalai Lama. The Chinese took him into custody and sentenced him to house arrest.
- Liu Xiaobo and his wife Liu Xia.

=== Republic of China (ROC) ===
- Zhang Xueliang, ordered by Chiang Kai-shek to be kept under house arrest after the Xi'an Incident in 1936. Even after the Nationalists' retreat to Taiwan, he remained in house arrest until Chiang Ching-kuo's death in 1988.

=== Egypt ===
- Ibn al-Haytham (Alhacen), Iraqi scientist working in Egypt. In 1011, he feigned madness in fear of angering the Egyptian caliph Al-Hakim bi-Amr Allah. He was kept under house arrest until the caliph's death in 1021.
- Mohamed Naguib, former president of Egypt. He led a military coup in 1953 and deposed the former King Farouk. He was deposed by Gamal Nasser in 1954 and placed under house arrest.

=== Hawaii ===
- The last Hawaiian queen Liliuokalani persuaded leaders of the Republic of Hawaii to commute her prison sentence to house arrest. She was confined to an upstairs bedroom of Iolani Palace until she was released in 1896.

=== Hong Kong ===
- The pro-democracy media tycoon Jimmy Lai was granted bail by High Court of Hong Kong pending trial for charges under the Hong Kong national security law. The conditions for his bail included a term prohibiting Lai from leaving his residence except going to police station and court. It implied that Lai was put under a de facto house arrest.

=== Indonesia ===
- Sukarno, first president of Indonesia. He was deposed in 1967 by General Suharto (see: Transition to the New Order).
- Suharto, second president of Indonesia, was placed under house arrest for his corruption charges in May 2000. However, he was freed due to health problems in September 2000.

=== Iran ===
- Mohammad Mosaddegh, former premier of Iran was deposed by coup in 1953 with support of the United States. Following three years of imprisonment, he was placed under house arrest until his death.
- Grand Ayatollah Hossein-Ali Montazeri was sentenced to house arrest from 1997 to 2003.
- Mehdi Karroubi, an influential Iranian reformist politician, democracy activist, mojtahed, and chairman of the National Trust Party, Chairman of the parliament from 1989 to 1992 and 2000 to 2004, and a presidential candidate in the 2005 and 2009 presidential elections. He has been under house arrest since February 2011.
- Mir-Hossein Mousavi is an Iranian reformist politician, painter and architect who served as the 79th and last prime minister of Iran from 1981 to 1989. He was a candidate for the 2009 presidential election. He has been under house arrest since February 2011.
- Googoosh is a famous Iranian singer and actress. After the Iranian Revolution she was under a 21-year ban from performing and was assumed to be under house arrest for much of the time.

=== Italy ===
In Italy, house arrest (in Italian arresti domiciliari) is a common practice of detaining suspects, as an alternative to detention in a correctional facility, and is also commonly practiced on those felons who are close to the end of their prison terms, or for those whose health condition does not allow residence in a correctional facility, except some particular cases of extremely dangerous persons. As per article 284 of the Italian Penal Procedure Code, house arrest is imposed by a judge, who orders the suspect to stay confined in their house, home, residence, private property, or any other place of cure or assistance where they may be housed at the moment. When necessary, the judge may also forbid any contact between the subject and any person other than those who cohabit with them or those who assist them. If the subject is unable to take care of their life necessities or if they are in conditions of absolute poverty, the judge may authorize them to leave their home for the strict necessary time to take care of said needs or to exercise a job. The prosecuting authorities and law enforcement can check at any moment whether the subject, who is de facto considered in state of detention, is complying with the order; violation of house arrest terms is immediately followed by transfer to a correctional facility. House arrests cannot be applied to a subject that has been found guilty of escape within the previous five years.

Notable cases:

- Erich Priebke, former SS captain, condemned for war crimes (Ardeatine massacre in Rome on 24 March 1944, when 335 Italian civilians were killed by Nazi force of occupation) to life imprisonment in 1996, spent under house arrest for the last part of his life, from 1998 to 2013 (when he died age of 100).
- Adriano Sofri, journalist and former far left political leader, convicted in 1997 for the murder of Police Officer Luigi Calabresi (1972), spent under house arrest, for health reasons, the period between 2005 and 2012.
- Silvia Baraldini, activist of Black Liberation Army in the US (sentenced to 43 years by Federal Court under the Racketeer Influenced and Corrupt Organizations Act (RICO) for conspiring to commit two armed robberies, driving a secondary getaway car during the prison break of murder convict and fellow political activist Assata Shakur, and contempt of court), transferred to Italy in 1999, spent the sentence on house arrest from 2001 to 2006, for health reasons.
- Giovanni Scattone and Salvatore Ferraro, convicted for manslaughter of Marta Russo, spent a period of their sentence under house arrest and community service.

=== Malaysia ===
In November 2026, former Malaysian sixth Prime Minister Najib Razak is transferred to serve a two-year house arrest in Kuala Lumpur until 23 August 2028, as part of a conditional pardon following his conviction over the 1MDB scandal and embezzelment of SRC International funds.

=== New Zealand ===
At sentencing, the judge may sentence an offender to home detention where they would otherwise receive a short-term prison sentence (i.e. two years or less). Home detention sentences range from 14 days and 12 months; offenders are confined to their approved residence 24 hours a day and may only leave with the permission of their probation officer.

Electronic monitoring equipment is extensively used by the New Zealand Department of Corrections to ensure that convicted offenders subject to home detention remain within approved areas. This takes the form of a Global Positioning System (GPS) tracker fitted to the offender's ankle and monitoring units located at their residence and place of employment. As of 2015 over three thousand persons were serving home detention sentences under GPS surveillance.

- Phil Rudd, drummer for Australian rock group AC/DC, was sentenced to eight months' home detention at his waterfront mansion in Tauranga for charges relating to methamphetamine possession and making death threats.

=== Nigeria ===
- Shehu Shagari, President of Nigeria was placed under house arrest on December 31, 1983, following a military coup which ousted his government (see: Nigerian Second Republic).
- General Muhammadu Buhari, Military Head of State was confined to his residence following the palace coup which ejected him from office.
- MKO Abiola, was placed under house arrest after he declared himself the rightful winner of the 1993 presidential elections, against the wishes of the Ibrahim Babangida military junta. He was detained for five years until his death in 1998.

=== Pakistan ===
- Zulfikar Ali Bhutto, 9th Prime Minister and 4th President of Pakistan. He was deposed in 1977 in a military coup – Operation Fair Play – led by Chief of Army Staff General Muhammad Zia-ul-Haq. Bhutto was put to trial and hanged later in 1979.
- Nawaz Sharif, 12th Prime Minister. Sharif was deposed in 1999 in a similar military coup led by Chief of Army Staff and Chairman of the Joint Chiefs of Staff Committee General Pervez Musharraf. Sharif was put in a forced trial, but due to foreign pressure exerted by Saudi Arabia and the United States, Sharif was exiled to Saudi Arabia which narrowly spared his life to face the same fate as of Bhutto.
- Imran Khan, former captain of Pakistan cricket team and chairman of Pakistan Movement of Justice (PTI), was placed under house arrest at the declaration of a state of emergency by Chief of Army Staff General Pervez Musharraf on November 3, 2007.
- Chief Justice Iftikhar Muhammad Chaudhry, Chief Justice of Pakistan, was put under house arrest on November 3, 2007, by General Pervez Musharraf. His arrest led to mass protest and Lawyers' Movement.
- Dr. Abdul Qadeer Khan, Pakistan's top scientist and founder of Pakistan's Gas-centrifuge program of the Pakistan's nuclear device was also put under house arrest for a long time by General Pervez Musharraf. Khan was forced to attend continuous military debriefings by Musharraf and was put in house arrest for a long time. Later, he was released from imprisonment in 2008 by the order of Islamabad High Court and the Supreme Court of Pakistan.

=== Philippines ===
- Joseph Estrada, former president of the Philippines

=== Catholic Church ===
- Galileo Galilei was put under house arrest for his advocacy for Copernicus's theory of the Sun in the middle of the universe and the Earth in motion about the Sun. He stayed under house arrest from 1634 until his death in 1642.

=== Singapore ===
- Chia Thye Poh, a former leftist populist Member of Parliament, was arrested without charges and held under detention without trial between 1966 and 1989 under the Internal Security Act for allegedly conducting pro-communist activities against the government, with the intention of causing a communist revolution. 22 years later, he was released and placed under house arrest for another nine years in a guardhouse on the resort island of Sentosa and made to pay the rent, on the pretext that he was now a "free" man. All restrictions were eventually lifted in 1998.
- S. Iswaran, a former People's Action Party Member of Parliament and cabinet minister, was prosecuted in January 2024 for involvement in 35 charges for corruption relating to businessman Ong Beng Seng and obstruction of justice. He was imprisoned for a year starting October 7, 2024, before commuting to house arrest four months into his imprisonment on February 8, 2025.

=== South Africa ===
House arrest was a common tool of the South African apartheid government, used to silence their opponents, along with banning orders.

- Helen Joseph was the first person put under house arrest, on 13 October 1962, and was not released until a cancer diagnosis in 1971.
- Bram Fischer, after being diagnosed with cancer while in Pretoria Local Prison after being sentenced to life for furthering Communism in apartheid-era South Africa, was released to be placed under house arrest due to pressure from the anti-apartheid groups.
- Ahmed Kathrada ("Kathy")
- Walter Sisulu
- Winnie Mandela
- Frances Baard
- Robert Sobukwe

=== Soviet Union ===
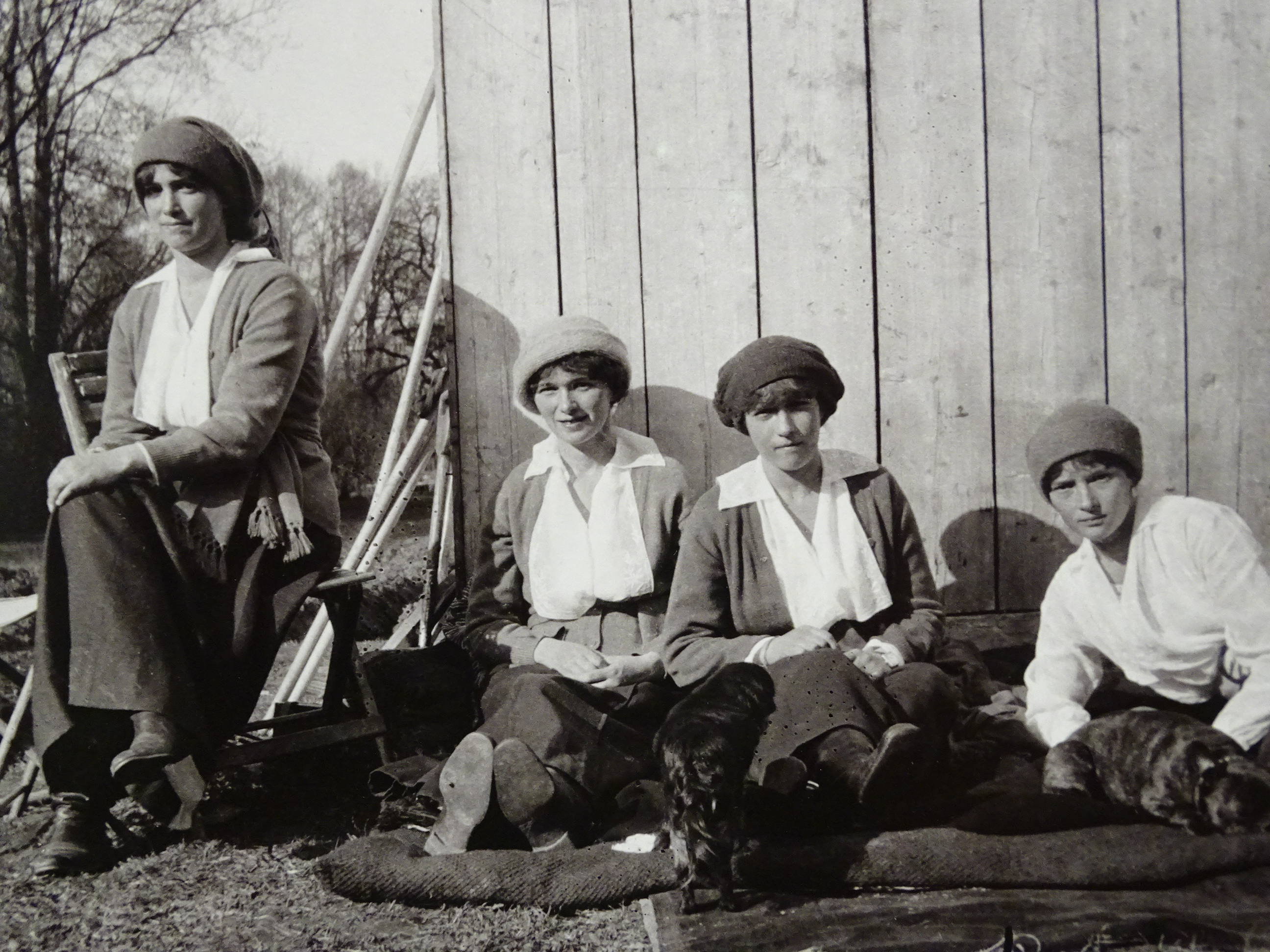
Grand Duchesses Maria, Olga, Anastasia and Tatiana Nikolaevna under house arrest in Tsarskoye Selo, May 1917

- Nicholas II, his wife, four daughters, one son and four retainers were placed under house arrest for over a year before communist revolutionaries murdered them on 17 July 1918.
- Former premier Nikita Khrushchev was placed under house arrest for the seven years before his death after being deposed in 1964.
- Academician Andrey Sakharov was placed under house arrest in 1980 and released in 1987.
- The president of the Soviet Union, Mikhail Gorbachev, was placed under house arrest during the 1991 Soviet coup d'état attempt on August 19, 1991.

=== Tunisia ===
- Habib Bourguiba, former president of Tunisia. He was deposed in a military coup in 1987 and held in house arrest.
- Muhammad VIII al-Amin, former king of Tunisia, was deposed in 1957 by Habib Bourguiba and restrained to house arrest.

=== United Kingdom ===
- The Prevention of Terrorism Act 2005 (repealed 2011) provided that suspected terrorists could be detained under house arrest without trial. This was repealed on the grounds that it was a breach of the Human Rights Act 1998.

=== United States ===
- 6ix9ine, a rapper known for "Gummo", and Day69. He was released from his 2-year prison sentence for racketeering and drug trafficking, due to the COVID-19 pandemic, and was placed in house arrest until November 2020.
- Sami Al-Arian, a professor and prominent advocate for human rights, named by Newsweek as a "premier civil rights activist" for his efforts to repeal the use of secret evidence in trials, was held under house arrest in Northern Virginia from 2008 until 2014 when federal prosecutors filed a motion to dismiss charges against him. Al-Arian had visited the White House several times, had met Bill and Hillary Clinton, and had met and campaigned for George W. Bush.
- William Calley, U.S. Army officer responsible for the My Lai massacre, served 3 1/2 years under house arrest when the president commuted his original sentence of life imprisonment.
- Dr. Dre (born Andre Romelle Young), one of the founding fathers of gangsta rap and former member of the influential hip-hop group N.W.A, was sentenced to house arrest after being convicted of assaulting a record producer.
- Rodney King, motorist who served a short sentence under house arrest for reckless driving.
- Debra Lafave, a former middle-school teacher, was sentenced to three years of house arrest on November 22, 2005, for "lewd and lascivious battery" on a 14-year-old student.
- Adrian Lamo, served six months under house arrest following his convictions for hacking into The New York Times and Microsoft.
- Boosie Badazz (born Torrence Hatch); the rapper was held under house arrest awaiting trial after East Baton Rouge sheriff's deputies found marijuana and a Glock in his car.
- Lindsay Lohan in 2011, served house arrest for violating her probation.
- Bernard Madoff, after his investment scandal was discovered, and $50 billion went missing.
- Paul Manafort, under house arrest awaiting trial for various charges related to the Special Counsel investigation into Donald Trump's presidential campaign. He was returned to jail on June 15, 2018, on suspicion of obstruction of justice and witness tampering.

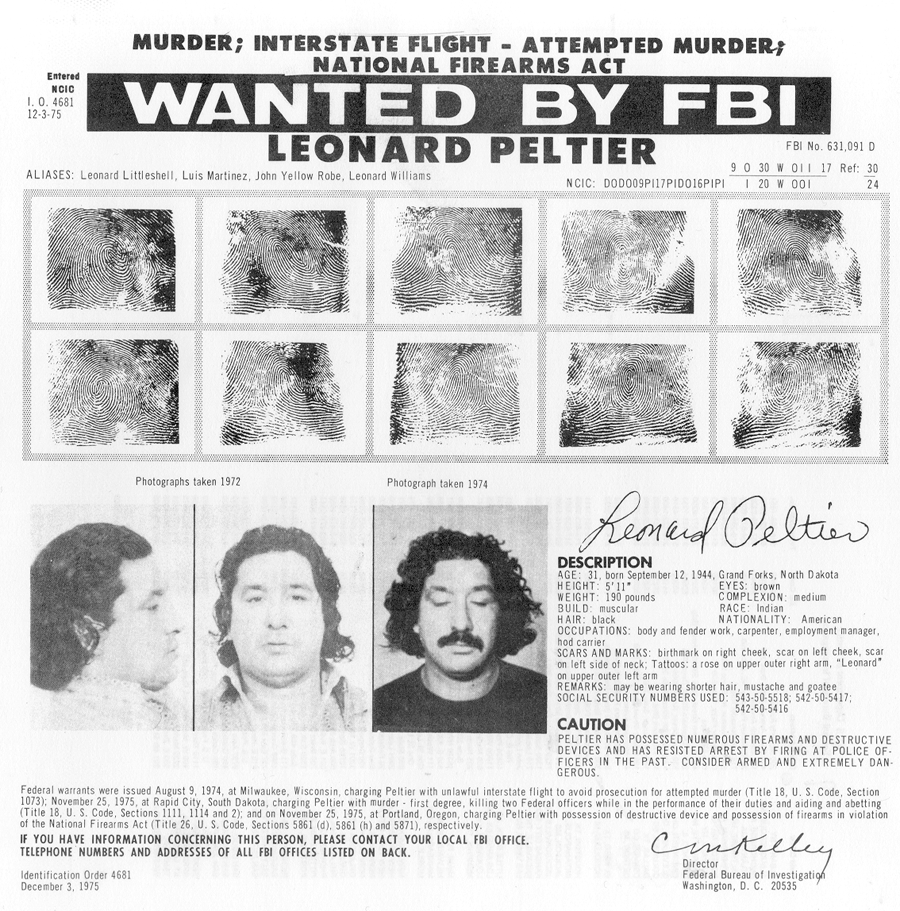
FBI wanted poster for Leonard Peltier

Clemency granted by President Biden on 19 January 2025 which takes effect on 18 February 2025

- Leonard Peltier was given house arrest by US President Joseph Biden on January 19, 2025.
- John G. Rowland, former governor of Connecticut, spent four months under house arrest after serving 10 months in federal prison for corruption while in office.
- Jerry Sandusky, former college football coach, spent 10 months under house arrest during his sex abuse trial. He was placed on house arrest in December 2011 after he posted $250,000 bail on the sex abuse charges, because a judge ruled that he was too dangerous to be outside his home. Sandusky caused public concern, as his backyard bordered a school playground, and he was often seen on his back porch watching school kids play during break times, which many found inappropriate for a man who was awaiting trial on charges of abusing children. Sandusky was convicted of the charges in June 2012, but remained on house arrest until his sentencing on October 9, 2012, when he was sentenced to a prison term of 30 to 60 years, a practical life sentence. Sandusky was not given credit for the time he served under house arrest, meaning his earliest possible release date is exactly 30 years from the day of his sentencing.
- Donté Stallworth, an NFL wide receiver, was sentenced on June 16, 2009, to two years under house arrest for killing a pedestrian with his vehicle due to driving while intoxicated in Miami, Florida.
- Martha Stewart was sentenced to five months under house arrest following her release from prison on March 4, 2005.
- Dominique Strauss-Kahn was held under house arrest on bail as an alternative to detention at Riker's Island before his trial for sexual assault. Strauss-Kahn was released from house arrest on 1 July 2011.
- Lionel Tate was sentenced to one year under house arrest under the terms of the plea bargain offered in January 2004.
- T.I. (born Clifford Joseph Harris), an American rapper and co-CEO of Grand Hustle Records, was sentenced to house arrest after gun charges.
- Michael Vick, former Atlanta Falcons quarterback, was approved for transition to home confinement from his federal incarceration on February 26, 2009.
- Norman Whitfield, former Motown producer and songwriter, was convicted in 2005 of tax evasion for failing to report more than $4 million worth of royalties to the Internal Revenue Service, fined $25,000 and sentenced to six months under house arrest in lieu of jail time because of health issues, including diabetes. Whitfield died of diabetes three years later.
- Tay-K (born Tamor McIntyre), an American rapper, was under house arrest, awaiting trial for capital murder and aggravated burglary charges. He cut off his ankle monitor and fled from his hometown of Arlington, Texas to Elizabeth, New Jersey. While a fugitive, he recorded his biggest hit single to date, "The Race", before his capture on June 30, 2017.
- Austin Jones, American former YouTuber and singer placed on home confinement three days after he was arrested on June 12, 2017, for producing child pornography. As a part of his release, he was barred from using the Internet and social media while he awaits trial.
- Lewis A male Polydactyl Long-haired black and white cat who was placed under house arrest in March 2006

=== Yugoslavia ===
- Aloysius Stepinac, Cardinal Archbishop of Zagreb sentenced to 16 years imprisonment for collaboration with the Nezavisna Država Hrvatska (Independent State of Croatia) regime, was released to house arrest after five years.

== In popular culture ==
=== Literature ===
- A Gentleman in Moscow

=== Film ===
- Cherish (film)
- Disturbia (film)
- House Arrest (1996 film)
- The Nines
- 100 Feet
- Ant-Man and the Wasp
- Tower Heist
- Isle of Dogs

=== Television ===
- Goode Behavior (TV series)
- The Sopranos – "House Arrest" episode
- Family Guy – "Mind Over Murder" episode
- Shameless (American TV series) – multiple episodes (season 4)
- American Vandal
- 24 (season 6) – former US President Charles Logan
- White Collar (TV series)
- Ginny & Georgia

== See also ==
- Internment
- Curfew
- Exile
- Open prison
