= Meng Yongshan =

Chinese former procurator (born 1964)

- 蒙永山

Chief Prosecutor of Qinghai People's Procuratorate
- In office November 2018 – June 2021
- Deputy: Jia Xiaogang; Tai Ben; Zhang Jie
- Preceded by: Yin Bai
- Succeeded by: Zha Qingjiu

Personal details
- Born: November 1964 (age 61) Guigang, Guangxi, China
- Party: Chinese Communist Party (1992–2021; expelled)
- Education: Southwest University of Political Science & Law; Sichuan University

Meng Yongshan (Chinese: 蒙永山; pinyin: Méng Yǒngshān; born November 1964) is a former Chinese procurator. As of June 2021 he was under investigation by China's top anti-corruption agency. Previously he served as chief prosecutor and party branch secretary of Qinghai People's Procuratorate.

== Biography ==
Meng was born in Guigang, Guangxi, in November 1964. In 1981, he enrolled at the Southwest University of Political Science & Law where he received his Bachelor of Laws degree in 1985. In 1999 he graduated from the Criminal Law Postgraduate Course of Sichuan University. He once served as chief prosecutor of Qinzhou People's Procuratorate. He was promoted to deputy prosecutor of Guangxi People's Procuratorate in September 2006. In March 2014 he was promoted again to become deputy chief procurator. He was appointed to be party branch secretary of Qinghai People's Procuratorate in October 2018, concurrently holding the chief prosecutor position since the next month.

== Downfall ==
On June 2, 2021, he turned himself in and is cooperating with the Central Commission for Discipline Inspection (CCDI) and National Supervisory Commission for investigation of "suspected violations of disciplines and laws".

His deputy, Jia Xiaogang, was sacked for graft in July 2020 and expelled from the Chinese Communist Party (CCP) and dismissed from public office in November of that same year.

On August 16, 2021, he was expelled from the Communist Party and removed from public office. On October 9, he was indicted on suspicion of accepting bribes.

On July 12, 2022, he was sentenced to 11 years in prison and fined two million yuan by the Chifeng Intermediate People's Court.

Legal offices
| Preceded by Yin Bai | Chief Prosecutor of Qinghai People's Procuratorate; 2018–2021 | Succeeded by Zha Qingjiu |
