= Meng Caicheng =

Chinese activist (1859–1928)

Meng Caicheng (蒙裁成, 1859–1928) was one of the leaders of the Railway Protection Movement, which contributed to the outbreak of the Xinhai Revolution that overthrew the Qing Dynasty and established the Republic of China.

== Early years ==
Meng Caicheng was born in Yanting County, Sichuan, China. He passed the Provincial Exam during the reign of Guangxu Emperor, then he was appointed as Director of Mianzhu County Education Department. After several years, he started to work as a professor at Chengdu Governmental Institution and appointed as Supervisor of Gentry Class at the Political-Legal School. He advised students not only to learn specific knowledge but also to be useful to the society. Students were not used to doing gymnastics, so Meng served as an example in the courtyard. He was highly respected and called "Mr. Gongfu" (literally, Public Father Figure).

== Railway protection movement ==
In 1905, Sichuan Province established the Sichuan-Hankou Railway Company. However, the company management was beset by corruption and mismanagement and construction effort made little progress. During August 1910, Sichuan Advisory Department started to run official newspaper "Shu Gazette" with the propaganda "Overseeing Administration and Promoting Institutionalism". Meng Caicheng was one of the sponsors of "Shu Gazette", which published articles about important political events and also disclosed the corruption and degeneration of the official class. The newspaper was forced to stop publication in July 1911.

On April 26, 1911, Wang Renwen, the Deputy Governor of Sichuan, presented a memorial to the Bureau of Civil Affairs. In the Memo, Wang reported that "the Sichuan-Hankou Railway Company representative stakeholder Meng Caicheng and others ever advised the Department to notify all the official business to government organs and the public. So they were running Sichuan Railway Monthly to publish all important issues about Sichuan Railway such as finance, accounting, construction and operation."

On May 9, 1911, the Qing authorities ordered the nationalization of all locally controlled railway signed a local agreement with Great Britain, Germany, France and the United States. The nationalization order drew strong opposition across Southern China, especially Sichuan. Pu Dianjun, Meng Caicheng and other influential members of the Sichuan Provincial Assembly organized the Railway Protection League on June 17, and made public speeches against the plan.

On August 2, Zhao Erfeng arrived Chengdu and took the post of the Viceroy of Sichuan. On September 7, Zhao Erfeng had Pu Dianjun, Luo Lun, Yan Kai and other leaders arrested and closed the company. Afterwards, Meng Caicheng asked the Governor Zhao Erfeng to have him arrested as well. As an appointed official by imperial government, Meng Caicheng was imprisoned alone at the police department.

Enraged protestors marched on the Viceroy's office. Zhao Erfeng ordered troops to open fire and dozens of protestors were killed. Bloodshed further inflamed the protestors. Led by the Tongmenghui, an armed revolution broke out all over Sichuan Province. On October 5, Zhao Erfeng released Meng Caicheng, Hu Rong and other leaders.

The Qing Court ordered Duanfang, the Viceroy of Huguang (Hubei and Hunan), to reinforce Sichuan with troops from Hubei, which weakened defenses in Wuhan. On October 10, 1911, revolutionaries in the New Army units that remained in Wuhan launched the Wuchang Uprising. On November 14, Zhao Erfeng released Pu Dianjun from prison and negotiated established Great Han Military Government of Sichuan. On November 27, Sichuan declared independence from the Qing dynasty.

On December 9, 1911, Yin Changheng reorganized the Military Government of Sichuan and took up the post of governor. Yin appointed Meng Caicheng as Magistrate of Ba-An Prefecture to prevent Xizang from declaring independence. After Meng arrived Ba-An, he established policies to promote peace between ethnically Han and Zang residents. There was little conflict between Zang and Han during his administration.

== Late years ==
In 1913, Meng Caicheng returned to Chengdu and worked as the President of Chengdu Capital High School. In 1921, Meng Caicheng was selected as the President of Chongqing Second Lady's Normal School. While there, he employed several important Communists such as Xiao Chunu, Zhang Wentian and Yun Daiying, as well as famous professors and governmental officials such as Meng Wentong, Deng Shaoqin, Li Xiaofang, Tang Tiefeng, Yuan Yunsheng, and Lu Zuofu. He also supported student participation in the "Deyang Wan" Protest March and sponsored representative members to attend the First National Assembly of Kuomintang, led by Sun Yat-sen.

In 1926, Meng Caicheng retired and returned to his hometown Yanting. The next year, he was appointed as the President of Yanting Lady's School. He died while holding the position.
