= Lecture Room =

Chinese educational television programme

- Traditional Chinese: 百家講壇
- Simplified Chinese: 百家讲坛
Transcriptions
Standard Mandarin
- Hanyu Pinyin: Bǎijiā Jiǎngtán

Lecture Room is a Chinese television programme produced by China Central Television (CCTV), in which scholars from various disciplines are invited to provide lectures. It was first broadcast on 9 July 2001 on CCTV-10. In its early days, featured topics included biology, physics, economics, history and literature, and the lecturers were from around the world. Its focus has gradually changed, as recent programmes focus more on Chinese history and Chinese culture.

The show's title is literally translated as The Hundred Schools of Thought Forum. Lecture Room is only an English adaptation of its Chinese title.

== Lecture series ==
- Yi Zhongtian, Influential Personalities of the Han dynasty; Analysis of the Three Kingdoms (品三国)
- Liu Xinwu, Liu Xinwu Exposes the Secrets of Dream of Red Chamber I-IV (刘心武揭密红楼梦 1–4)
- Yan Chongnian, Emperors of the Qing dynasty, The Fall of Ming and Rise of Qing
- Mao Peiqi, Emperors of the Ming dynasty
- Wang Liqun, People in Han dynasty
- Meng Xianshi, Incident at Xuanwu Gate (玄武门之变)
- Yuan Tengfei, Vicissitudes of the Two Song Dynasties, Sai Bei San Chao
- Meng Man, History of the Tang dynasty and Wu Zetian

== Other notable lecturers and guest lecturers ==
- Bill Gates, entrepreneur (2003)
- Han Qide, medical scientist
- Stephen Hawking, physicist (2002)
- Tsung-Dao Lee, physicist (2001, 2002)
- Robert Mundell, economist (2003)
- Ouyang Ziyuan, geochemist
- Mary Poovey, writer (2002)
- Samuel C. C. Ting, physicist (2001, 2002)
- Wang Meng, writer (2003)
- Wu Guanzhong, artist (2001)
- Chen Ning Yang, physicist (2001, 2002)
- Ye Jiaying, sinologist
- Yu Dan, professor (2006, 2007)
- Yu Guangzhong, writer (2002, 2003)
- Yu Qiuyu, writer (2002, 2003)
- Zhou Ruchang, writer
