= CCTV-10 =

China Central Television science and education channel

CCTV-10 科教
- Country: China

Programming
- Picture format: 1080i HDTV (downscaled to 576i for the SD feed)

Ownership
- Owner: China Central Television
- Sister channels: CCTV-10,CCTV-1,CCTV-5,CCTV-14

History
- Launched: 9 July 2001
- Former names: Television China

Links
- Website: CCTV-10

Availability

Terrestrial
- Digital TV (DTMB): Digital channel number varies by area

Streaming media
- CCTV program website: CCTV-10

CCTV-10 is the science and education focused channel of the China Central Television (CCTV) network in the People's Republic of China. Its schedule includes mostly local and imported documentaries, as well as educational studio productions.

== Programmes ==
- Lecture Room [百家讲坛]
- Great Masters [大家]
- Reading [读书, lit. Reading Books]
- The Doctor is In [健康之路, lit. The Way to Health]
- People [人物]
- Yingshi Mingtang [影视名堂]
- Just So [原来如此]
- Approaching Science [走近科学]

== See also ==
- CCTV channels
