= Jian Bozan =

Chinese historian

- 翦伯赞
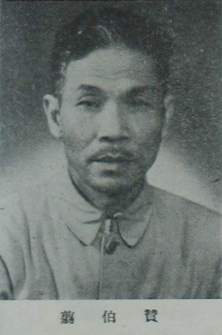
- Jian Bozan in 1949
- Born: 14 April 1898; Taoyuan County, Hunan, Qing China
- Died: 18 December 1968 (aged 70); Beijing, China
- Cause of death: Suicide
- Occupation: Historian

Academic background
- Education: Beijing University of Law and Politics; National Wuchang University of Commerce; University of California

Academic work
- Discipline: History
- Sub-discipline: History of Pre Qin, Qin and Han dynasties
- Institutions: Peking University
- Notable works: Outline of the History of China

Chinese name
- Traditional Chinese: 翦象時
- Simplified Chinese: 翦象时
Transcriptions
Standard Mandarin
- Hanyu Pinyin: Jiǎn Xiàngshí

Courtesy name
- Traditional Chinese: 伯贊
- Simplified Chinese: 伯赞
Transcriptions
Standard Mandarin
- Hanyu Pinyin: Bózàn

Jian Bozan (simplified Chinese: 翦伯赞; traditional Chinese: 翦伯贊; pinyin: Jiǎn Bózàn; April 14, 1898 – December 18, 1968) was a Chinese scholar and Marxist historian of Uyghur descent. Born in Taoyuan County, Hunan Province, Jian became an early supporter of the Chinese Communist Party. From 1952 to his death, he was Vice President of Peking University. Like many authoritative academic figures of his generation, he was persecuted during the Cultural Revolution over a perceived divergence between his own ideas and that of dominant Maoist orthodoxy of the time. Unable to bear torture, Jian committed suicide in 1968.

== Biography ==
=== Genealogical descent ===
"Jian" (翦) is very unusual surname in China. Jian Bozan traced his ancestry to Hala Bashi (哈勒八十) later Jian Bashi (翦八士) or Jian Baizhe (剪敗著) who was a Uyghur Buddhist from the Uyghur Buddhist Kingdom of Qocho who served the Emperor of the Ming Dynasty in quelling the earliest of the Miao rebellions by the Miao ethnic minority. The Emperor rewarded his family with the surname "Jian" (翦). The Jian family then settled in Taoyuan County in Hunan province for generations. Some of Hala Bashi's descendants married Hui Muslims in Taoyuan, and their descendants are Muslim. However, most members of the Jian family in modern times are not Muslim.

=== Early years and education ===
Jian was born in 1898.

In 1916, Jian entered school in Beijing, where he studied and conducted research about Chinese economic history. His graduation thesis was a 50,000-character study of the history of China's currency system. Believing that industry was China's savior, he travelled to the University of California in 1924 to research economics. During this time, he studied Anti-Dühring, The Origin of the Family, Private Property, and the State, The Communist Manifesto, and other famous Marxist works. He returned to China in 1926. Jian was a patriot, and participated in the protests leading up to the March 18 Massacre of that year. He published his first Marxist interpretation of Chinese history during the 1930s, and joined the Chinese Communist Party (CCP) in 1937. In 1934, while serving as secretary to Qin Zhen, deputy head of the Judicial Yuan, Jian went on a tour of numerous countries around the world. As a close ally of the CCP, Jian became professor of history at Peking University after 1952, and later served as dean of the faculty of history and vice-president of the university.

Although best known for his history writing, Jian also wrote and exchanged poetry with Communist Party intellectuals, including with Deng Tuo and Guo Moruo.

=== During the Cultural Revolution ===
Jian became a target of struggle during the early stages of the Cultural Revolution. During the early 1960s, Jian began to advocate historical accounts that combined the methodology of class analysis and historicism. For this, Mao Zedong criticized Jian at the end of 1965. Qi Benyu, a prominent Maoist figure of the time period, also criticized Jian on four counts: opposing the theory of class struggle, denigrating peasant revolutions, praising emperors and kings, and applauding conciliatory policies. Jian also suffered from severe torture and was lynched at the hands of radicals. The ill treatment drove Jian to commit suicide. Jian, along with his wife, took an overdose of sleeping pills and died on December 18, 1968.

Jian was posthumously rehabilitated in 1978, at the behest of Deng Xiaoping.

== Abridged list of publications ==
- Treatise on Chinese History (中国史论集)
- Discussions of Historical Questions (历史问题论丛)
- Anthology of Historical Works by Jian Bozan (翦伯赞历史论文选集)
- Historical Data and the Study of History (史料与史学)
- Recent Capitalist Economy of the World (最近之世界资本主义经济)
- A Course in the Philosophy of History (历史哲学教程)
- An Outline of Chinese History (中国史纲)
- History of the Qin and Han Dynasties (秦汉史)
- Timeline of Chinese and Foreign History (中外历史年表)
- General Reference on Chinese History (中国通史参考资料)

== See also ==
- Wu Han
- Chen Boda
