= Miao Rebellion (1735–1736) =

Rebellion in China

- Part of the Miao Rebellions
| Date | February 1735 – November 1736 |
| Location | Guizhou, China |
| Result | Qing dynasty victory |

Belligerents
| Qing dynasty | Miao |

Commanders and leaders
| Zhang Guangsi; Ha Yuansheng | Baoli (executed); Red Silver (executed) |

Casualties and losses
| unknown | 18000Killed |

The Miao Rebellion of 1735–1736 was an uprising of autochthonous people from southwest China (called by the Chinese "Miao", but including more than the antecedents of the present-day Miao national minority).

== Background ==
Since the Ming dynasty (1368–1644), southwestern China (Yunnan, Guizhou, Guangxi) was within the control of the Ming Empire, but the state control of these territories was weak. The Yongzheng Emperor of the Qing dynasty decided to strengthen it, replacing local, semi-independent chieftains, called tusi, with regular Qing administration. To achieve this goal, the prince Ortai led several military campaigns into the area, pacifying them between 1726 and 1732. However, military control did not stop the official abuse and extortion, suppressing only the reaction against them.

== Rebellion ==
By 1735, misrule and extortion proved too much and the local people rose to fight. Some of them were desperate enough as to kill their wives and children before joining the rebellion, thus burning all bridges behind them. The uprising started in Taigong, then covering the area of Liping and Duyun. Local Qing administration, unable to cope with the rebels, suggested making a kind of agreement with them, but the Qianlong Emperor recalled the previous commanders and appointed Zhang Guangsi, an experienced officer under Ortai, to quell the rebellion. The uprising was bloodily suppressed, the last rebels doggedly fighting at Niupidajing. Altogether Qing armies destroyed approximately 1200 Miao forts and killed over 18,000 warriors.

The campaign lasted from February to November 1736. Zhang, meanwhile appointed Governor-General of Guizhou, started to build roads, strengthening the garrisons and opening the mines, to enhance both imperial control and the economy of the region.

The suppression of the revolt granted the area half a century of peace, but the deep causes of unrest remained unchanged and the tensions grew again, until the Miao rebelled again in 1795.

== See also ==
- Miao Rebellion (1795–1806)
- Miao Rebellion (1854–1873)
- Miao Rebellions (Ming Dynasty)
