= Zhangjiang =

Zhangjiang may refer to several places in China:

- Zhangjiang Town (张江镇), in Pudong, Shanghai
  - Zhangjiang Hi-Tech Park (张江高科) in Pudong, Shanghai
  - Zhangjiang Hi-Tech Park station on Shanghai Metro Line 2
  - Zhangjiang Road station on Shanghai Metro Line 13
- Zhangjiang, Taoyuan (漳江镇), a historic town of Taoyuan County, Hunan
- Zhangjiang Subdistrict (漳江街道), a subdistrict and the seat of Taoyuan County, Hunan

== See also ==
- Zhanjiang, a city in Guangdong, China
