= Miao Rebellion (1854–1873) =

Qing dynasty uprising of ethnic groups in the Guizhou province

Miao rebellion 1854–1873
- Part of the Miao Rebellions
Date	1854–1873
Location	Guizhou province of China
Result	Qing victory

Belligerents
Qing dynasty Chu Army	Miao; Tujia; Bouyei; Hui

Commanders and leaders
Wang Wenshao; Su Yuanchun; Gong Jichang	Zhang Xiumei (executed); Yang Daliu (executed); Bao Dadu †; Zhang Tingying (surrendered)

Casualties and losses
Unknown	5 million

The Miao rebellion of 1854–1873, also known as the Qian rebellion (Chinese: 黔亂; pinyin: Qián luàn; lit. 'Guizhou uprising') was an uprising of ethnic Miao and other groups in Guizhou province during the reign of the Qing dynasty. Despite its name, Robert Jenks estimates that ethnic Miao made up less than half of the uprising's participants. The uprising was preceded by Miao rebellions in 1735–36 and 1795–1806, and was one of many ethnic uprisings sweeping China in the 19th century. The rebellion spanned across the Xianfeng and Tongzhi periods of the Qing dynasty, and was eventually suppressed with military force.

The rebellion stemmed from a variety of grievances, including long-standing ethnic tensions with Han Chinese, poor administration, grinding poverty and growing competition for arable land. The eruption of the Taiping Rebellion led the Qing government to increase taxation, and to simultaneously withdraw troops from the already restive region, thus allowing a rebellion to unfold. It also inspired the ethnic minorities in Guizhou to revolt. Millenarianism was an influence especially on the non-ethnic Miao participants.

The rebellion started in March 1854, when "Yang Yuanbao, a farmer of the Buyi ethnic group from Dushan County, led hundreds of people to revolt". By May 1854, the Qing army had "brutally suppressed" this revolt. In March 1855, Zhang Xiumei from Taigong led a Miao rebellion which was followed by other groups in the wider region. In May 1869 several rebel groups won a battle against the Chu Army at Huangpiao. After capturing several towns, the rebels, together with the Taiping attacked the provincial capital Guiyang. Guizhou governor Zhao Deguan was killed in an ambush by the rebels.

Once the Taiping rebellion was suppressed, the Qing government defeated the Miao rebels one-by-one.

The aftermath of the rebellion left many areas of Guizhou depopulated, with farmland being overgrown and towns destroyed, causing many Miao, Hmong and other groups to migrate into Vietnam and Laos.

The term "Miao", explains the anthropologist Norma Diamond, does not mean only the antecedents of today's Miao national minority; it is much more general term, which had been used by the Chinese to describe various aboriginal, mountain tribes of Guizhou and other southwestern provinces of China, which shared some cultural traits. They consisted of 40–60% population of the province.

English language accounts of the Miao Rebellion include the first-hand memoirs of William Mesny in his magazine "Mesny's Chinese Miscellany" (1895–1905); David Leffman's biography of Mesny, "The Mercenary Mandarin"; and "Insurgency and Social Disorder in Guizhou" by Robert D. Jenks. Most contemporary records from the uprising comes from Qing officials who were sent to quell the rebellion.

== See also ==
=== Miao rebellions ===
- Miao Rebellion (1735–1736)
- Miao Rebellion (1795–1806)
- Miao Rebellions (Ming Dynasty)

=== Rebellions (non-Miao) ===
- Red Turban Rebellion (1854–1856)
- Dungan revolt (1862–1877)
- Dungan revolt (1895–1896)
- Nian rebellion

=== Other topics ===
- Small Sword Society
