= Ha Yuansheng =

Ha Yuansheng 哈元生

General of Anlong County (安龍總兵)
- In office 1730–1731

Commander-in-chief of Yunnan
- In office 1731–1735

Personal details
- Born: 1680 Hejian, Zhili, Qing China
- Died: 1738 (aged 57–58) Hami, Xinjiang, Qing China

Ha Yuansheng (Chinese: 哈元生) was an ethnic Hui military general of the Qing dynasty of China. He is known for his roles in the suppression of various uprisings by Bouyei, Miao and Yi tribes against the Qing dynasty during the reigns of the Kangxi Emperor, Yongzheng Emperor and Qianlong Emperor.

== Biography ==
Born as Hui Muslim native of Hejian, Zhili Province, Ha Yuansheng had risen to captain rank at Fort Jianchang, Qian'an, Zhili Province, but was dishonorably discharged in 1721 for allowing lumber smuggling. Later, he restarted his tenure as battalion commander (營參將) in Yunnan around 1723.

Reinstated in 1724 under Emperor Shizong (Yongzheng) as second captain, he joined a Miao suppression expedition in Weining, Guizhou, earning promotion to adjutant major there in 1725.In 1726, he led a punitive force against rebelling Miao prefects from Wumeng and Zhenxiong who invaded Dongchuan Prefecture, Yunnan, succeeding via personal bravery under Governor-General Ortai; promoted to lieutenant colonel at Xunzhan battalion, Yunnan, in 1727. As a protegee of Ortai, he along with his comrades such as Zhang Guangsi and Zhang Yunsui (governor of Yunnan at that time, got promoted into key positions in Yunnan and Guizhou.

In 1728, Ha pacified a revolt led by a Miao woman surnamed Lu, capturing her family; he then subdued Miao in Aluma near Alü, Guizhou, and an allied uprising in Leibo, Sichuan. Elevated to colonel at Yuanjiang regiment, Yunnan, he returned to Alü and flogged a Miao chieftain, inciting unrest quelled in days but requiring extended stabilization. Ortai criticized Ha's tactlessness to Shizong, who pardoned him for his indispensable soldiery despite coarseness and poor foresight. Later in 1729, he was promoted to colonel at Liping, Guizhou.

In 1730, Ha Yuanshing further promoted into zongbing (總兵), or brigade-general rank at Anlong County, he participated in the suppression of the Miao tribal uprising. Later,he participated in suppressing rebellions by the Yi peoples and Bouyei people at Guizhou. as the Yi communities from Weining and Wumeng regions of Miao people staged another uprising against Qing authority, prompting Ha Yuansheng to deploy Muslim forces for suppression. A local reference work (Weining Yizu cidian) records that "General Ha's Muslim army defeated thousands of the Yi rebel force in Weining and shot dead Heigua Mumo, the chief of the rebel force. In the battles about eighty strongholds of the Yi rebel forces were destroyed." These events contributed to a further decline in the local Yi population. During this era, numerous Han and Hui individuals established settlements in Weining, primarily former soldiers granted land following the Yi pacification. It was notable that two chieftains of those Miao rebels; Mù mò (暮末) and Hēi guǎ (黑寡), both was celebrated as brave and fierce warriors with each of them has the moniker of Wàn Rén Dí (Lit. A match for ten thousand men or A warrior with strength of ten thousand men). Hēi guǎ entered the battle with a long spear and attacked Ha Yuansheng. However, Ha Yuansheng blocked the spear with his left hand and pulled out an arrow with his right hand, killing the Miao warrior instantly. He then continues to engage Mù mò, shooting him to kill the Miao's remaining combatant. As the two rebel leaders dead, Ha Yuansheng cut their heads and stake them to poles, then continues to advance to complete the suppression against the Miao rebels. In the same year, Ha Yuansheng led an expedition to pacify Muslim rebels led by Rumeng Tusi. Afterwards, he settled down in Zhaotong . These Muslim soldiers under his command played important role in the social development in the area .

Later, In the ninth year of Emperor Yongzheng's reign (1731), he was appointed governor of Yunnan appointment as Yunnan commander-in-chief (later transferred to Guizhou).Summoned to Beijing in 1732 for Shizong's audience and brief Grand Council service, Ha visited his mother but was recalled to Guizhou to handle unrest at Miao. After her 1733 death, he was ordered to forgo mourning. As Guizhou commander-in-chief, he presented a 1734 Miao territories gazetteer, approved but revised by Governor Yuan Zhancheng (d. 1744).

Under the Qing Dynasty rule, The modern day distribution of Hui enclaves in Yunnan—concentrated Mongol conquest routes and former military agricultural settlements were scattered due to Mu Ying's and Ha Yuansheng's expeditions against tribal uprisings—corroborates the province's successive waves of Hui settlement. After the campaign to subjugate the Wusa tribe of the subethnic Yi, substantial number of Sino-Muslim soldiers under Ha Yuansheng stayed and scattered across the northern Yunnan and Western Guizhou. These Sino-Muslim community later developed into various lineages in Shaanxi, such as the Ma Family, the Zhang family, etc.

In 1735, after receiving a title of General Yangwei, Ha was tasked with quelling Guzhou-area Miao Rebellion (1735–1736) alongside another generals. However, he also experienced bureaucratic clash over authority with emissary Zhang Zhao. At Zhang Guangsi's request, Ha was discharged, arrested, and sent to Beijing, where the Grand Council sought execution. however new Emperor Qianlong gave him pardon and conferred him rank of colonel in 1736, then send him to Hami, where Ha spent his time for the rest of his life. from here, Ha Yuansheng donated the gold, silver and treasures which rewarded by the emperor for him to build the Nan Da Mosque and to charity help his poor fellow tribesmen. He died at the age of 58.

Ha Shangde (哈尚德, d. 1773), Son of Ha Yuansheng, Ha Shangde reached brigade-general at Yichang, Hubei (1743); Liangzhou, Shaanxi (1744); Linyuan, Yunnan; and Guzhou (1748). He campaigned against Jinchuan rebels (see Fuheng) before dismissal for mistreating civilians and subordinates, followed by bribery charges proposing flogging and exile. Reinstated by Emperor Gaozong in 1757 as colonel at Hami headquarters, he was soon held liable for sheep losses during transport to camps, resulting in discharge, cangue punishment, and reimbursement orders. He retired home in 1766 and died there.

== Character analysis ==
At the zenith of his military career, Ha Yuansheng orchestrated the successful resolution of numerous punitive expeditions on behalf of the throne, particularly against Miao rebellions in the southwestern provinces. Renowned for his exceptional valor in combat, he ascended to the prestigious rank of general. Despite recurrent lapses in judgment during military operations, Emperor Qianlong repeatedly condoned these shortcomings, valuing Ha's unparalleled efficacy as a frontline commander above administrative decorum or strategic prudence.
