= Zhangjiang, Taoyuan =

Historic town in Taoyuan County, Hunan, China

Coordinates: 28.90723°N 111.48045°E

Zhangjiang Town (Chinese: 漳江镇; pinyin: Zhāngjiāng Zhèn) was a historic town and the former seat of Taoyuan County in Hunan, China. The town was reformed through the amalgamation of Chehuyuan Township (Chinese: 车湖垸乡), Shenshuigang Township (Chinese: 深水港乡) and the former Zhangjiang Town on November 20, 2015.

Zhangjiang was located in the west of the county, it was bordered by Fengshu Township (Chinese: 枫树维吾尔族回族乡) and Qinglin Township (Chinese: 青林回族维吾尔族乡) to the north, Xujiaqiao Township (Chinese: 许家桥回族维吾尔族乡) of Dingcheng District and Mutangyuan Township (Chinese: 木塘垸乡) to the east, Yaotianping Town (Chinese: 尧天坪镇) of Dingcheng District to the southeast, Taohuayuan Town (Chinese: 桃花源镇), Jianshi Town (Chinese: 剪市镇) and Niwotan Township (Chinese: 泥窝潭乡) to the southwest, Sanyanggang Town (Chinese: 三阳港镇) to the northwest. The town had an area of 220.63 km^{2} (85.19 sq mi) with a population of 153,200 (as of 2015), The town had 25 villages and 19 communities under its jurisdiction, its seat was at West Wuling Rd. (Chinese: 武陵西路) It ceased to be a separate town and was divided into Zhangjiang Subdistrict and Xunyang Subdistrict in 2017.

== History ==
Zhangjiang was an ancient town with a long history. It had always been the seat of Taoyuan County formed in 963 AD (Song dynasty). It was incorporated as a town in January 1941, it took its name after the Zhangjiang River (漳江), Zhangjiang Town was renamed to Chengguan Town in January 1951.

Zhangjiang Town was reformed through the merging Bazilu Township (Chinese: 八字路乡), Yaohe Township (Chinese: 尧河乡) and the former Chengguan Town (Chinese: 城关镇) in November 1995, it had an area of an area of 139.9 km^{2} (54.0 sq mi) with a population of about 100,000 (as of 1995), when it had 41 villages and 7 communities. In 2011, the subdivisions of Zhangjiang were reduced to 14 villages and 16 communities from 31 villages and 16 communities through the amalgamation of villages.

Chehuyuan Township (Chinese: 车湖垸乡) and Shenshuigang Township (Chinese: 深水港乡) were merged to it on November 20, 2015. it had an area of 220.63 km^{2} (85.19 sq mi) with a population of 153,200 (as of 2015), and it had 25 villages and 19 communities under its jurisdiction. In 2017, Zhangjiang Town was divided into two subdistricts of Zhangjiang and Xunyang.

== Subdivisions ==
The two subdistricts of Zhangjiang and Xunyang established through the dividing Zhangjiang Town in 2017
| 13 villages and 13 communities composing of Zhangjiang Subdistrict | | 10 villages and 8 communities composing of Xunyang Subdistrict | |
| English | Chinese | English | Chinese |
| Baifoge Community | 白佛阁社区 | Bazilu Community | 八字路社区 |
| Chuwang Community | 楚旺社区 | Dongtinggong Community | 洞庭宫社区 |
| Fangchenglu Community | 纺城路社区 | Erligang Community | 二里岗社区 |
| Guanjiaping Community | 官家坪社区 | Lianhuahu Community | 莲花湖社区 |
| Guanyinxiang Community | 观音巷社区 | Meixiqiao Community | 梅溪桥社区 |
| Huanghuajing Community | 黄花井社区 | Wanshouqiao Community | 万寿桥社区 |
| Jiaoyan Community | 交岩社区 | Yaohe Community | 尧河社区 |
| Tongmugang Community | 桐木港社区 | Yifengfang Community | 义丰坊社区 |
| Wenchangge Community | 文昌阁社区 | Fenghe Village | 丰禾村 |
| Wenxingyuan Community | 文星园社区 | Fuqingshan Village | 福庆山村 |
| Xiyuan Community | 西苑社区 | Huifeng Village | 廻峰村 |
| Yufusi Community | 渔父祠社区 | Jiaoren Village | 教仁村 |
| Zhangjiangge Community | 漳江阁社区 | Luluoping Village | 菉萝坪村 |
| Fuqiang Village | 富强村 | Luxikou Village | 绿溪口村 |
| Gaohu Village | 高湖村 | Taiping Village | 大平村 |
| Gaoqiao Village | 高桥村 | Tiechuanyan Village | 铁船堰村 |
| Gaoyan Village | 高岩村 | Yanshi Village | 仙石村 |
| Hailuoshan Village | 海螺山村 | Zhenjiangdu Village | 镇江渡村 |
| Hexie Village | 和谐村 | | |
| Jinfeng Village | 金凤村 | | |
| Jinwang Village | 金旺村 | | |
| Jinyan Village | 金雁村 | | |
| Juntianping Village | 均田坪村 | | |
| Shengli Village | 胜利村 | | |
| Yanquan Village | 延泉村 | | |
| Yuntai Village | 云台村 | | |
