= Hmong rebellion =

Hmong Rebellion refers to a rebellion among the Hmong people, also known as the Miao or Meo. It could refer to:

- Miao rebellion, any of several rebellions against various Chinese dynasties; the Miao being an alternative term for the Hmong; in Chinese controlled zones and China.
- Vue Pa Chay's revolt (1918–1921), a Hmong rebellion against French colonizers in Indochina
- Lao Hmong insurgencies, in the mid-20th century and after the Pathet Lao conquest; in Laos
