= Xunyang Subdistrict =

Subdistrict of Hunan, China

Xunyang Subdistrict (Chinese: 浔阳街道; pinyin: Xúnyáng Jiēdào) is a subdistrict of Taoyuan County in Hunan, China. The subdistrict was incorporated from a part of the former Zhangjiang Town in 2017. It has an area of 109.25 km^{2} (42.18 sq mi) with a population of 56,800 (as of 2017). The subdistrict has 10 villages and 8 communities under its jurisdiction, and its seat is at West Wuling Rd. (Chinese: 武陵西路)

== Subdivisions ==
Administrative divisions of Xunyang Subdistrict
8 communities		10 villages	
English	Chinese	English	Chinese
Bazilu Community	八字路社区	Fenghe Village	丰禾村
Dongtinggong Community	洞庭宫社区	Fuqingshan Village	福庆山村
Erligang Community	二里岗社区	Huifeng Village	廻峰村
Lianhuahu Community	莲花湖社区	Jiaoren Village	教仁村
Meixiqiao Community	梅溪桥社区	Luluoping Village	菉萝坪村
Wanshouqiao Community	万寿桥社区	Luxikou Village	绿溪口村
Yaohe Community	尧河社区	Taiping Village	大平村
Yifengfang Community	义丰坊社区	Tiechuanyan Village	铁船堰村
		Yanshi Village	仙石村
		Zhenjiangdu Village	镇江渡村
