= Miao rebellions =

There have been several rebellions among the Miao people (also known as the Hmong) in Chinese history:

== During the Ming dynasty ==
- Miao rebellions in the Ming dynasty (14th–15th centuries)
- Bozhou rebellion (1589–1600)

== During the Qing dynasty ==
- Miao Rebellion (1735–36)
- Miao Rebellion (1795–1806)
- Miao Rebellion (1854–73)

== See also ==
- Hmong rebellion
