= Hala Bashi =

Uyghur Buddhist general of Ming dynasty

Hala Bashi (哈勒八十) (misspelled as 哈勒巴士) later Jian Bashi (翦八士) or Jian Baizhe (剪敗著) was a Uyghur Buddhist general of the Ming dynasty and its Hongwu Emperor. The Hongwu Emperor changed his name to Jian Bashi.

== Miao rebellions ==
Hala Bashi, a general from the Uyghur Buddhist Kingdom of Qocho in Turpan, fought for the Ming dynasty against the ethnic minority Miao rebels during the Miao rebellions of 1370s. He led Uyghur Buddhist troops to defeat the Miao rebels and the Ming emperor settled him down in Taoyuan County, Changde, northern Hunan. A minority of Hala Bashi's descendants mixed with Hui Muslims in Taoyuan which is why some of the Jian family members are now Muslim due to marrying Hui Muslims, but Hala Bashi was not Muslim. Most of his descendants in the Jian family like Jian Bozan are not and never were Muslim either.
