= Zhang Guangsi =

baitalabure hafan Zhang Guangsi

Viceroy of Chuan-Shaan
- In office 1747–1748
- Preceded by: Qingfu
- Succeeded by: Furdan (acting)

Viceroy of Guizhou
- In office 18 July 1736 – 20 April 1747
- Preceded by: Zhang Yunsui (as Viceroy of Yun-Gui)
- Succeeded by: Zhang Yunsui (as Viceroy of Yun-Gui)

Governor of Guizhou
- In office 1735–1747
- Preceded by: Yuan Zhancheng
- Succeeded by: Sun Shaowu
- In office 1728–1732
- Preceded by: Shen Tingzheng
- Succeeded by: Yuan Zhancheng

Viceroy of Huguang
- In office 1735
- Preceded by: Maizhu
- Succeeded by: Shi Yizhi

Personal details
- Born: Unknown
- Died: 1749 Beijing
- Education: Imperial Academy (guozijian)
- Occupation: politician
- courtesy name: Xiyu (希禹)

Military service
- Allegiance: Qing dynasty
- Branch/service: Han Chinese Bordered Red Banner
- Battles/wars: Dzungar–Qing Wars; Miao Rebellion (1735–1736); First Jinchuan campaign

Zhang Guangsi

Chinese name
- Traditional Chinese: 張廣泗
- Simplified Chinese: 张广泗
Transcriptions
Standard Mandarin
- Hanyu Pinyin: Zhāng Guǎngsì

Manchu name
- Manchu script: ᠵᠠᠩ ᡤᡠᠸᠠᠩ ᠰᡟ
- Romanization: jang guwang sy

Zhang Guangsi (died 1749), courtesy name Xiyu (希禹), was a Qing dynasty official from the Han Chinese Bordered Red Banner.

When he was a student of the Imperial Academy, he obtained the rank of a prefect (候補知府) by purchase ("juanna", 捐納). In 1722 he was appointed magistrate of Sizhou (思州知府). In 1726, he was transferred to Chuxiong then to Liping. In 1727 he was promoted to Judicial Commissioner of Guizhou (貴州按察使) and in the next year, because of his success in quelling the Miao rebellion, he was promoted to Governor of Guizhou (貴州巡撫). He made suggestions to the emperor to pacify the aborigines that in 1732 he was awarded the hereditary rank "baitalabure hafan" (拜他喇布勒哈番, aka qiduwei 騎都尉).

In the meantime the Qing army was at war with Dzungar Khanate. Zhang was appointed as the Deputy General-in-Chief of Western Circuit (西路副將軍) to lead an army to attack Dzungar, assisting the General-in-Chief Yue Zhongqi. In 1735, Dzungar sued for peace and finally reached a ceasefire. Another Miao rebellion broke out in the meantime, Zhang was appointed Viceroy of Guizhou to pacify the aborigines. The rebellion was bloodily suppressed in the next year.

In 1747, the Slob Dpon, the chieftain of Greater Jinchuan, attacked his neighbor chiefdoms and defied a detachment of troops sent against him by the governor of Sichuan. Because of his success in pacifying Miao people, Zhang was made the Viceroy of Chuan-Shaan to command the armies sent to subdue these rebels. However, his men were halted by the unfamiliar topography, the precipitous mountain passes, and the native stone towers known as diaolou (碉樓). One year later, Qianlong Emperor ordered Necin to reinforce his army, however, it was defeated again. The two commanders quarreled over military strategy, mutually blamed each other. Zhang was stripped off his position, escorted to Beijing and later executed. Meanwhile, Necin was also beheaded in full view of the army.
