= Taoyuan County =

Taoyuan County 桃源县
- County
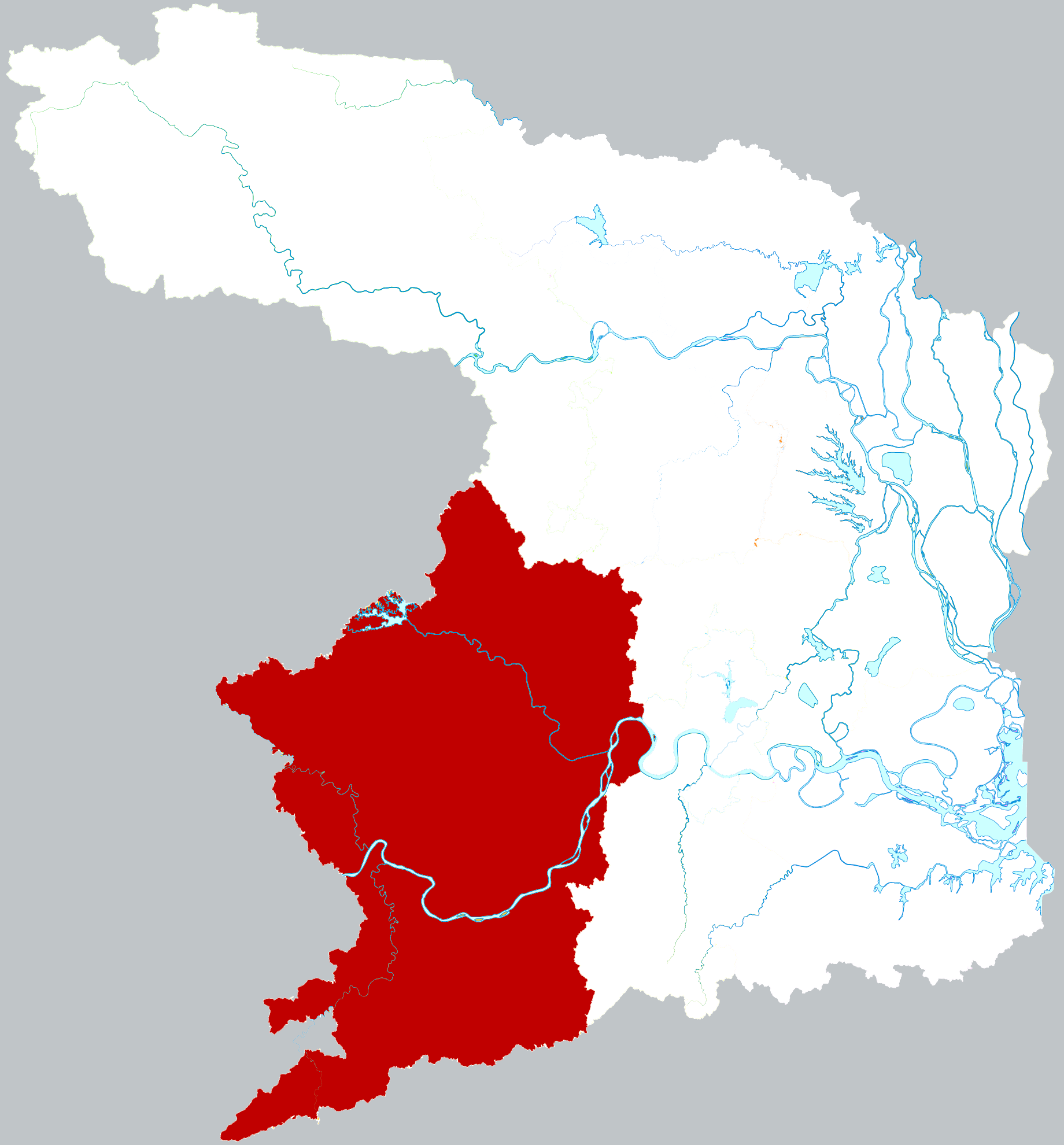
- Location of Taoyuan County within Changde

- Location in Hunan
- Coordinates: 28°54′22″N 111°14′02″E
- Country: China
- Province: Hunan
- Prefecture-level city: Changde

Area
  - Total: 4,441 km^{2} (1,715 sq mi)
- Highest elevation: 1,130 m (3,710 ft)
- Lowest elevation: 40 m (130 ft)

Population (2007)
  - Total: 976,000
  - Density: 220/km^{2} (569/sq mi)
- Time zone: UTC+8 (China Standard)
- Postal code: 517000
- Area code: 0736
- Website: Taoyuan.gov.cn

Taoyuan County (simplified Chinese: 桃源县; traditional Chinese: 桃源縣; pinyin: Táoyuán Xiàn) is under the administration of Changde, Hunan Province, China. The Yuan River, a tributary of the Yangtze, flows through Taoyuan. It covers an area of 4441 square kilometers, of which 895 km^{2} (346 sq mi) is arable land. It is 229 km (142 mi) from Zhangjiang Town, the county seat, to Changsha, the capital city of Hunan province. The county occupies the southwestern corner of Changde City and borders the prefecture-level cities of Zhangjiajie to the northwest and Huaihua to the southwest.

== History ==
The area of present-day Taoyuan County belonged to the Chu state during the Spring and Autumn period and the Warring States period, and was a portion of Linyuan County during the Western Han dynasty. In AD 50, the 26th year of Jianwu, the Eastern Han dynasty was merged with Yuannan County, and administered by the Wuling Prefecture, separating it from Linyuan County. In AD 783, the third year of Sui dynasty, Wuling County was created by annexing the three counties Linyuan, Yuannan, and Hanshou, administered by the Langzhou Prefecture.

In AD 963, the third year of the Song dynasty, Taoyuan County was officially established by separating a part of Wuling County. It was named after its famous Taohuayuan (桃花源), named after the fable "Peach Blossom Spring".

Its capital, Zhanjiang (now Zhanjiang Subdistrict), is situated on the northern bank of Yuan River (Yuanjiang).

== Economy ==
Agricultural products include rice, wheat, edible oils, sesame seeds, peanuts, cotton, and tobacco. Manufactured products include machinery, textiles, chemicals, wood products, and leather goods. Local mines extract gold, silver, iron ore, and diamonds.

== Education ==
Taoyuan has 123,000 students enrolled in its elementary schools, middle schools and high schools. 99.99% of children of compulsory education age are enrolled in schools, and 93.2% of children with disabilities are enrolled in schools.

Approximately 2000 high school graduates are admitted to colleges and universities each year.

The First Middle School of Taoyuan (桃源一中), which includes both a middle school and high school, is the most prestigious school in Taoyuan County.

== Geography and climate ==
=== Subdivisions ===
According to the result on adjustment of township-level administrative divisions of Taoyuan county on November 20, 2015, Taoyuan County had 18 towns and 10 townships under its jurisdiction in 2015. Five townships were reorganized as towns on December 28, 2016; Mutangyuan Township was reorganized as a town, Zhangjiang Town ceased to be a separate town, it was incorporated into two subdistricts in December 2017. The county has two subdistricts, 23 towns and four townships under its jurisdiction.

2 subdistricts

- Xunyang (浔阳街道)
- Zhangjiang (漳江街道)

23 towns

- Cha'anpu (茶庵铺镇)
- Guanyinsi (观音寺镇)
- Huangshi (黄石镇)
- Jianshi (剪市镇)
- Jiaqiao (架桥镇)
- Jiuxi (九溪镇)
- Ligonggang (理公港镇)
- Longtan (龙潭镇)
- Mazongling (马鬃岭镇)
- Mutangyuan (木塘垸镇)
- Niuchehe (牛车河镇)
- Pantang (盘塘镇)
- Qihe (漆河镇)
- Reshi (热市镇)
- Sanyanggang (三阳港镇)
- Shaping (沙坪镇)
- Shuangxikou (双溪口镇)
- Taohuayuan (桃花源镇)
- Xi'an (西安镇)
- Yangxiqiao (杨溪桥镇)
- Yiwangxi (夷望溪镇)
- Zhengjiayi (郑家驿镇)
- Zoushi (陬市镇)

2 townships

- Niwotan (泥窝潭乡)
- Shejiaping (佘家坪乡)

2 Hui & Uyghur ethnic townships

- Fengshu (枫树维吾尔族回族乡)
- Qinglin (青林回族维吾尔族乡)

=== Geography ===
Taoyuan County is in the northwestern portion, 28°55′N 111°29′E, of Hunan Province. It is 118 km (73 mi) from its northernmost point, Laopeng village, Reshi Town, to its southernmost point, Shizi Ling, Xuejiachong village, Xi'an Town and 75 km (47 mi) from its easternmost post, Caoxiezhou, Renfeng village, Mutangyuan Township, to its westernmost post, Wanjiahe, Gaofeng village, Niuchehe Township. Its total area is 4,441.22 km^{2} (1,714.76 sq mi), which is the fourth largest in Hunan Province. 895 km^{2} (346 sq mi) is arable land, the largest area of arable land in Hunan Province.

The agricultural landscape consists of: 13.4% alluvial plains of the Yuanjiang River, 49.3% hillocks, and 36.0% hills and mountains.

=== Climate ===
Taoyuan County is a transition zone from subtropical to north subtropical having a humid subtropical climate with seasonal prevailing winds. All four seasons are distinct.

The average annual temperature is 17.0 Celsius. The average temperature is 4.8 degrees Celsius in January and 28.4 degrees Celsius in July.

The average annual precipitation is 146 centimeters (58 inches), gradually decreasing from south to north. The annual average relative humidity is 81%; the annual sunshine length is 1531 hours and frost-free period lasts 284 days.

Climate data for Taoyuan, elevation 49 m (161 ft), (1991–2020 normals, extremes 1981–present)
Month	Jan	Feb	Mar	Apr	May	Jun	Jul	Aug	Sep	Oct	Nov	Dec	Year
Record high °C (°F)	23.7 (74.7)	30.8 (87.4)	35.8 (96.4)	36.3 (97.3)	37.5 (99.5)	38.3 (100.9)	40.1 (104.2)	40.7 (105.3)	38.5 (101.3)	35.7 (96.3)	30.6 (87.1)	25.0 (77.0)	40.7 (105.3)
Mean daily maximum °C (°F)	8.7 (47.7)	11.5 (52.7)	16.2 (61.2)	22.5 (72.5)	26.9 (80.4)	30.0 (86.0)	33.2 (91.8)	32.6 (90.7)	28.2 (82.8)	22.7 (72.9)	17.1 (62.8)	11.4 (52.5)	21.7 (71.2)
Daily mean °C (°F)	5.0 (41.0)	7.4 (45.3)	11.7 (53.1)	17.5 (63.5)	22.1 (71.8)	25.6 (78.1)	28.6 (83.5)	27.9 (82.2)	23.5 (74.3)	18.0 (64.4)	12.5 (54.5)	7.2 (45.0)	17.3 (63.1)
Mean daily minimum °C (°F)	2.4 (36.3)	4.5 (40.1)	8.4 (47.1)	13.9 (57.0)	18.6 (65.5)	22.4 (72.3)	25.1 (77.2)	24.6 (76.3)	20.4 (68.7)	14.9 (58.8)	9.4 (48.9)	4.3 (39.7)	14.1 (57.3)
Record low °C (°F)	−7.3 (18.9)	−4.5 (23.9)	−1.0 (30.2)	2.5 (36.5)	9.4 (48.9)	13.4 (56.1)	18.4 (65.1)	16.0 (60.8)	11.2 (52.2)	4.6 (40.3)	−0.6 (30.9)	−5.4 (22.3)	−7.3 (18.9)
Average precipitation mm (inches)	66.9 (2.63)	76.6 (3.02)	121.9 (4.80)	157.7 (6.21)	194.6 (7.66)	220.7 (8.69)	206.8 (8.14)	139.3 (5.48)	103.5 (4.07)	94.9 (3.74)	83.9 (3.30)	41.7 (1.64)	1,508.5 (59.38)
Average precipitation days (≥ 0.1 mm)	12.4	12.6	15.9	15.5	15.2	15.1	12.5	10.9	9.5	11.5	10.7	10.3	152.1
Average snowy days	4.6	2.4	0.8	0	0	0	0	0	0	0	0.2	1.7	9.7
Average relative humidity (%)	81	80	80	80	80	83	80	80	81	82	82	79	81
Mean monthly sunshine hours	63.2	62.9	85.8	112.3	131.1	127.3	189.9	182.5	133.1	109.1	96.0	83.7	1,376.9
Percentage possible sunshine	19	20	23	29	31	30	45	45	36	31	30	26	30
Source: China Meteorological Administration

== Demographics ==
Taoyuan County has a population of 976,000 composed of a dominant Han ethnic group and twelve other minority ethnic groups of: Hui, Uyghur, Tujia, Manchu, Dong, Zhuang and Yao. The Uyghur and Hui number more than 3000 people.

=== Taoyuan Uyghurs ===
Around 5,000 Uyghurs live around Taoyuan County and other parts of Changde. They are descended from a Uyghur Buddhist leader Hala Bashi, from the Buddhist Uyghurs of Turpan (Kingdom of Qocho),) who the Ming dynasty Emperor Zhu Yuanzhang sent to northern Hunan in the 14th century. Along with him came Uyghur soldiers from which the Hunan Uyghurs descend. During the 1982 census 4,000 Uyghurs were recorded in Hunan. They have genealogies from the period beginning 600 years ago to the present day. Keeping genealogical records is a Han Chinese custom which the Hunan Uyghurs adopted. These Uyghurs were given the surname Jian by the Emperor; they received a Chinese education. A prominent Hunan Uyghur was Jian Bozan (1898–1968) who was a member of the Chinese Communist Party.

The Uyghur troops led by Hala were ordered by the Ming Emperor to crush Miao rebellions by the ethnic minority Miao people and were given titles by him. Jian (Chinese: 翦; pinyin: Jiǎn) is the predominant surname among the Uyghur in Changde, and Hunan. Hala Bashi was given the title "Grand General of South-Pacifying Post of the Nation" by the Emperor (镇国定南大将军; 鎮國定南大將軍; Zhènguó Dìngnán Dàjiàngjūn) A minority of the Buddhist Uyghur Hala Bashi's descendants mixed with Hui Muslims in Taoyuan which is why some of the Jian family members are now Muslim due to marrying Hui Muslims, but Hala Bashi was not Muslim. Most of his descendants in the Jian family like Jian Bozan are not and never were Muslim either. Another group of Uyghur have the surname Sai. Hui Muslims from the Hui Huang family of Xujiaqiao and Uyghur Jian family have intermarried in the Hunan area, and the Hui like the Hui Huang family of Xujiaqiao in Taoyuan were also used by the Ming Emperor to crush "barbarian" (Miao) revolts and the originally non-Muslim Uyghurs adopted Islam when intermarrying with Hui.

It is reported that they now number around 10,000 people.

==== Religious practice ====
There is some confusion as to whether Uyghurs in Changde practice Islam or not. Some scholars state that they do not practice Islam. Their genealogies indicate their Uyghur ancestry. Chinese news sources report that they are Muslim. Another report says they are not very religious, and eat pork. Older Uygurs disapprove of this, especially elders at the mosques in Changde, and they seek to draw them back to Islamic customs.

In addition to eating pork, the Uygurs of Changde Hunan practice other Han Chinese customs, like ancestor worship at graves. Some Uyghurs from Xinjiang visit the Hunan Uyghurs out of curiosity or interest. Also, the Uyghurs of Hunan do not speak the Uyghur language, instead, they speak Chinese as their native language, and Arabic for religious reasons at the mosque.

== Language ==
The Taoyuan dialect was profoundly influenced by the northern dialect since the path used by government messengers, speaking the northern dialect, travelling to Yunnan and Guizhou from the Song to the Qing dynasty, passed through Taoyuan. It was also influenced by the dialects of central Jiangxi since substantial numbers of people from Jishui, Zhangshu, and Fengcheng of Jiangxi relocated to Taoyuan in succession from the Ming dynasty to the early Qing dynasty.

There are two types of accents in the Taoyuan dialect, one of which is called the native accent spoken in the central area of Taoyuan, including Zhangjiang Town, Zoushi Town, Qihe Town, Sanyanggang Town, and part of Jianshi Town; the other is called the periphery accent, spoken in the strip area bordering the other counties.

Taoyuan dialect is a fusion of the northern and Jiangxi dialects. Its accent is close to those of the Sichuan, Chongqing, and Hubei dialects. It is categorized as Southwestern Mandarin.

== Culture ==
Taoyuan has its unique folk custom characteristics since it is located in a zone neighbouring surviving distinct ethnic groups.

In cooking, Lei cha (pounded tea), is a "five flavors soup" made by smashing a mixture of tea leaves, ginger, corn, meng beans and salt into a powder; it is popular drink in Taohuanyuan area. According to legend, Lei cha protected soldiers from pestilence caused by their inability to acclimatize to the environment in Taoyuan during the Eastern Han period when General Ma Yuan fought southward to Taoyuan.

Taoyuan has unique local operas. Wuling Opera is a popular local opera performed by professionals. Musty Notes received the National Artist Award for its performance and script writing. Nuo opera drama, called a "living fossil", is still widespread. The town of Sangyanggang is known as the home of Nuo Opera.

The Three Bar Drum, Yugu Drum, and string instruments are very popular as well.

== Notable residents ==
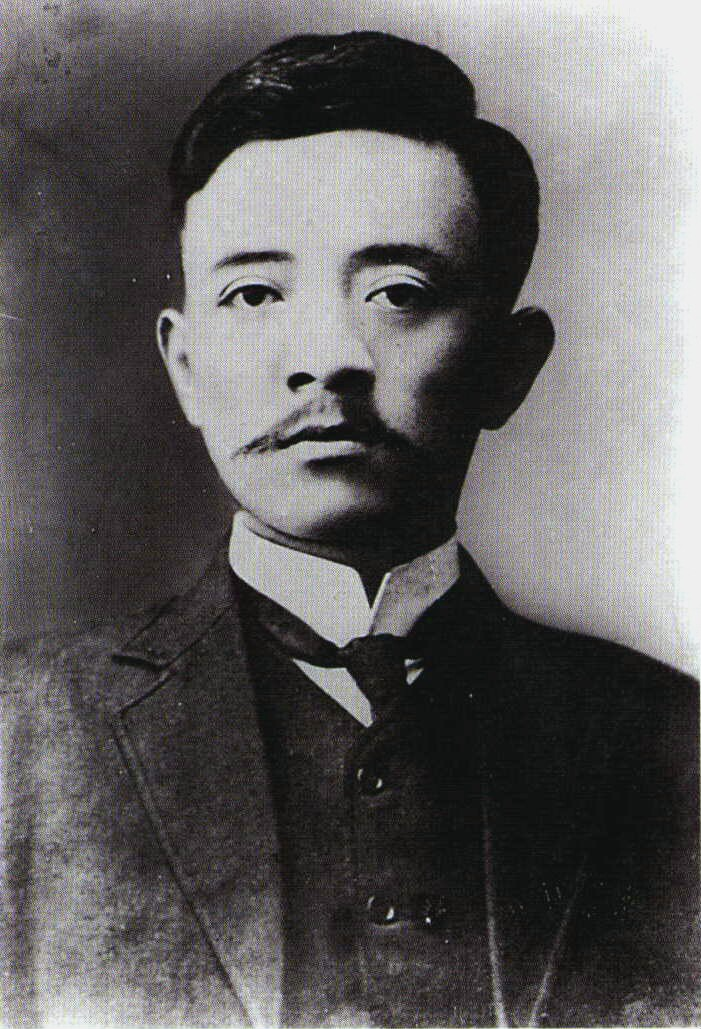
Song Jiaoren (宋教仁)

- Song Jiaoren (Apr 5, 1882 - Mar 22, 1913), a Chinese republican revolutionary, political leader and a founder of the Kuomintang.
- Liu Kan (1906 – Mar 3, 1948), posthumously awarded rank of General of the Republic of China Army in 1953, was born in Zhengaotian village, Taohuanyuan Town.
- Wang Qimei (王其梅; Wáng Qíméi, Dec 27, 1914—Aug 15, 1967), awarded rank of Major General of PLA in 1955, was born in Wangjiaping village, Sanyanggang Town.
- Jian Bozan (1898-Dec 18, 1968), a prominent Marxist historian, Vice President of Beijing University from 1952 to 1968, was born in Huiwei village, Fengshu Uyghur Autonomous Township.
- You Rizheng (1949 – May 25, 2002), second legislator of Taoyuan County, former mayor of Longtan District, and member of the second Legislative Yuan from 1993 to 1996.

== Tourist attractions ==
The Taohuayuan Scenic Area is a park modelled after the Peach Blossom Spring fable, (桃花源), about a land secluded from the outside mortal world depicted as an idyllic shangri-la by Tao Yuanming (365–427), an Eastern Jin dynasty poet.
