= Zhangjiang Subdistrict =

Subdistrict of Taoyuan County, Hunan, China

Coordinates: 28°54′26″N 111°28′50″E

Zhangjiang Subdistrict (Chinese: 漳江街道; pinyin: Zhāngjiāng Jiēdào) is a subdistrict and the county seat of Taoyuan County in Hunan, China. The subdistrict was incorporated from a part of the former Zhangjiang Town in 2017. It has an area of 111.38 km^{2} (43.00 sq mi) with a population of 97,000 (as of 2017). The subdistrict has 13 villages and 13 communities under its jurisdiction, and its seat is at North Yufu Rd. (Chinese: 渔父北路)

== Subdivisions ==
Administrative divisions of Zhangjiang Subdistrict
13 communities		13 villages	
English	Chinese	English	Chinese
Baifoge Community	白佛阁社区	Fuqiang Village	富强村
Chuwang Community	楚旺社区	Gaohu Village	高湖村
Fangchenglu Community	纺城路社区	Gaoqiao Village	高桥村
Guanjiaping Community	官家坪社区	Gaoyan Village	高岩村
Guanyinxiang Community	观音巷社区	Hailuoshan Village	海螺山村
Huanghuajing Community	黄花井社区	Hexie Village	和谐村
Jiaoyan Community	交岩社区	Jinfeng Village	金凤村
Tongmugang Community	桐木港社区	Jinwang Village	金旺村
Wenchangge Community	文昌阁社区	Jinyan Village	金雁村
Wenxingyuan Community	文星园社区	Juntianping Village	均田坪村
Xiyuan Community	西苑社区	Shengli Village	胜利村
Yufusi Community	渔父祠社区	Yanquan Village	延泉村
Zhangjiangge Community	漳江阁社区	Yuntai Village	云台村
