= Miao rebellions in the Ming dynasty =

14th- and 15th-century rebellions in China

- Part of the Miao rebellions
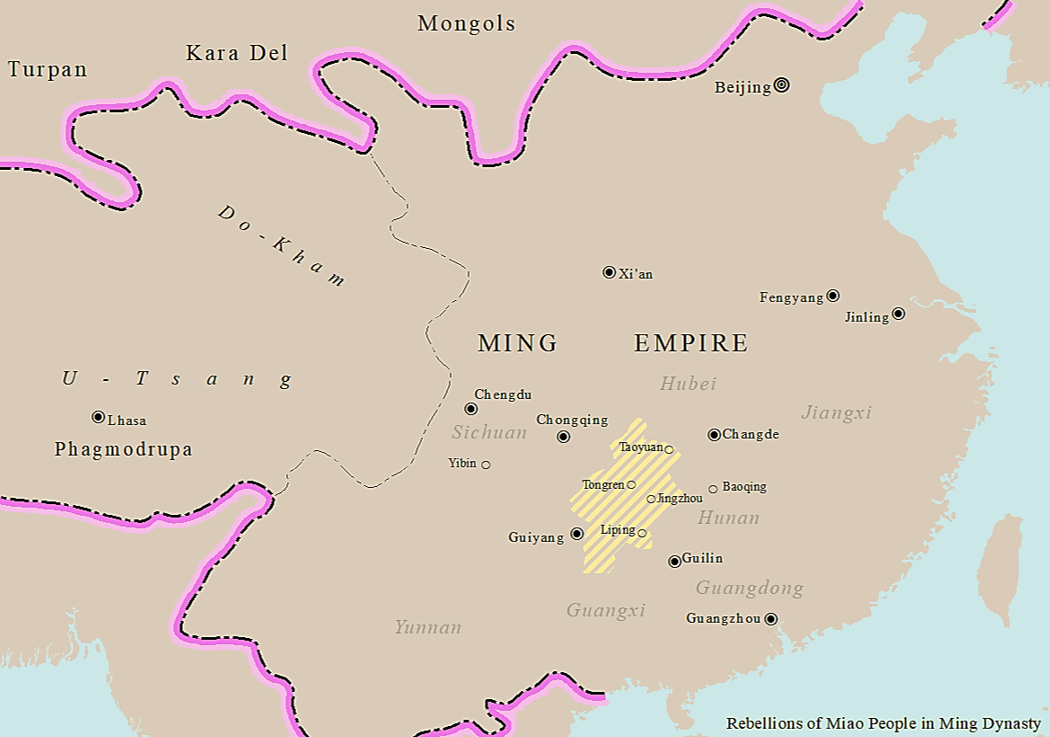
- Map showing the Miao rebellions in the Ming dynasty
| Date | 14th century, 15th century |
| Location | Sichuan, Guizhou, Yunnan, Huguang |
| Result | Ming victory |

Belligerents
| Ming dynasty | Miao, Yao and other indigenous rebels |

Commanders and leaders
| Hongwu Emperor; Zhengtong Emperor; Hala Bashi; Li Chen | Various leaders of Miao people |

Strength
| Thousands of Han Chinese, Chinese Muslim, and Uyghur troops 1,000 Mongol cavalry archers | Thousands of Miao, Yao and other indigenous rebels |

Casualties and losses
| Unknown | Tens of thousands of rebels killed, thousands of castrations |

The Miao rebellions in the Ming dynasty (simplified Chinese: 明朝苗民起义; traditional Chinese: 明朝苗民起義) were a series of rebellions of the indigenous tribes of southern China against the Ming dynasty, from the 14th to the 15th centuries. The Ming defeated the rebels with overwhelming force. Later, during the Qing dynasty, another series of Miao rebellions broke out.

== Rebellions ==
In one of the first Miao revolts, in the 1370s, several thousand Uyghur Buddhist warriors originally from the Kingdom of Qocho in Turpan were sent by the Hongwu Emperor to defeat Miao rebels in Taoyuan County, Changde, Hunan (at the time Hunan was part of Huguang province). The Uyghurs were all given titles and allowed to live in Changde, Hunan. The title of the Uyghur commander was "Grand General of South-Pacifying Post of the Nation" (simplified Chinese: 镇国定南大将军; traditional Chinese: 鎮國定南大將軍; pinyin: zhèn guó dìngnán dàjiàng jūn). The Uyghurs were led by Buddhist general Hala Bashi, who was awarded titles by the Hongwu Emperor and the surname Jian (Chinese: 翦; pinyin: Jiǎn). They live in Taoyuan County, Hunan province to this day. Chinese Muslim troops were also used by the Ming dynasty to defeat the Miao and other indigenous rebels in the area, and were also settled in Changde, Hunan, where their descendants still live. A minority of Hala Bashi's descendants mixed with Hui Muslims in Taoyuan which is why some of the Jian family members are now Muslim due to marrying Hui Muslims, but Hala Bashi was not Muslim. Most of his descendants in the Jian family like Jian Bozan are not and never were Muslim either.

On May 4, 1449, the Miao revolted again. The Ming government sent General Wang Ji to destroy the rebels. The Miao rebellions spread through Huguang and Guizhou. Guizhou was ransacked in 1459 and 1460 by government forces, who looted the town and sold many of the residents into slavery. The eunuch Yuan Rangyang was appointed Grand defender of Huguang and Guizhou.

Again multiple Miao rebellions broke out in the 1460s. The Miao and Yao rebelled in 1464, and the revolt spread throughout Guangxi, Hunan, Guizhou, Jiangxi and Guangdong. The Miao regrouped and had settled throughout southern China. On the Hunan Guizhou border, more rebellions broke out in 1466. The Ming rallied 1,000 Mongol cavalry archers and 30,000 soldiers in total to defeat the Miao. Ming commander Gen. Li Chen, who was an hereditary general, fought against the indigenous tribes for decades in the 15th century and used brutal tactics against them. He was determined to wage campaigns of extermination against the Miao whenever they rebelled—in 1467 and 1475, among others—and killed thousands of them.

Certain subgroups of Miao are known as Hmong. In the 16th century, the Ming dynasty sent ethnic Chinese to settle in the tribal areas of the Hmong and other indigenous tribes in the southwest. The Ming sent 2000 garrison troops to defeat the Hmong rebels, and 40,000 rebels were slaughtered. Yet by 1500 the Hmong were revolting in areas around Hunan province and had fought almost every year in an effort to gain their independence from imperial rule. The fervor and tenacity of these tribes had caused much discord and unrest. The Ming dynasty constructed the Hmong wall, which was 10 feet high and 100 miles long with military posts. The Hmong in Guizhou used armor made of buffalo skin or mail made of copper and iron, and weapons such as shields, spears, knives, crossbows and poisoned arrows. Two Chinese generals who defected and joined the Hmong gave them gunpowder weapons, such as flintlock rifles, cannons and blunderbusses, and showed the rebels how to make them.

An account of the origins of the Hmong in Sichuan says that the Ming Chinese in Guangdong defeated the ancestors of the Hmong, and forcibly relocated them to Sichuan.

The Chinese naming and classification of the southern tribes was often vague. When the Ming began colonizing the south, the classification of the natives began to grow more accurate.

The Ming commander crushed a Miao rebellion in 1460, and castrated 1,565 Miao boys, which resulted in the deaths of 329 of them. They were then turned into eunuch slaves. The Guizhou governor who ordered the castration of the Miao was reprimanded and condemned by Emperor Yingzong of Ming for doing it once the Ming government heard of the event. Since 329 of the boys died, even more were needed to be castrated.

== See also ==
- Miao Rebellion (1795–1806)
