= Islam during the Ming dynasty =

Overview of the role of Islam and Muslims in Ming dynasty China

As the Yuan dynasty ended, many Mongols as well as the Muslims who came with them remained in China. Most of their descendants took Chinese names and became part of the diverse cultural world of China. During the following Ming rule (1368–1644), Muslims truly adopted Chinese culture. Most became fluent in Chinese and adopted Chinese names and the capital, Nanjing, became a center of Islamic learning. As a result, the Muslims became "outwardly indistinguishable" from the Chinese.

The Ming dynasty saw the rapid decline in the Muslim population in the sea ports. This was due to the closing of all seaport trade with the outside world except for rigid government-sanctioned trade.

== History ==
=== Integration ===
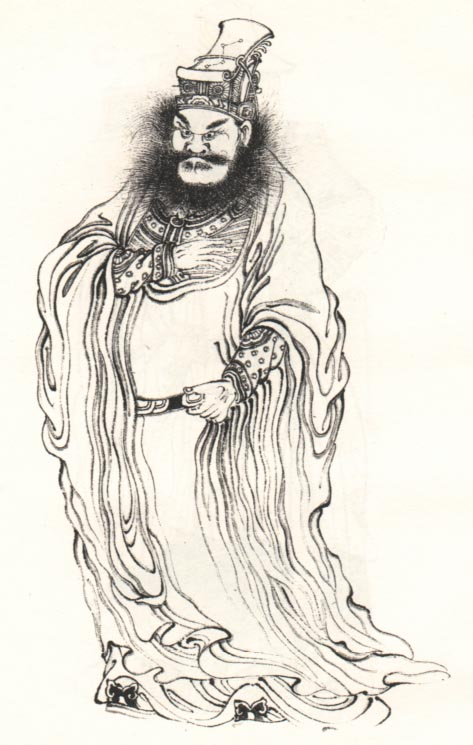
Hu Dahai was a Chinese Muslim general of the Hongwu Emperor.

As a result of increasing isolationism by the Ming dynasty, immigration from Muslim countries slowed down drastically, and the Muslims in China became increasingly isolated from the rest of the Islamic world, gradually becoming more sinicized and adopting the Chinese language and Chinese dress. Muslims became fully integrated into Chinese society. One interesting example of this synthesis was the process by which Muslims changed their names.

Foreign origin Muslims adopted the Chinese character which sounded the most phonetically similar to the beginning syllables of their Muslim names – Ha for Hasan, Hu for Hussain, Sa'I for Said and so on. Han who converted to Islam kept their own surnames like Kong, Zhang. Chinese surnames that are very common among Muslim families are Mo, Mai, and Mu – names adopted by the Muslims who had the surnames Muhammad, Mustafa and Masoud.

Muslims also sought to integrate themselves with the majority of the Chinese people during this time, making themselves as undistinguished as possible to assimilate.

Muslim customs of dress and food also underwent a synthesis with Chinese culture. The Islamic modes of dress and dietary rules were maintained within a Chinese cultural framework. Chinese Islamic cuisine is heavily influenced by Beijing cuisine, with nearly all cooking methods identical, and differing only in material due to religious restrictions. As a result, northern Islamic cuisine is often included as part of Beijing cuisine.

During the Ming dynasty, Chinese Islamic traditions of writing began to develop, including the practice of writing Chinese using the Arabic script (xiaojing) and distinctly Chinese forms of decorative calligraphy. The script is used extensively in mosques in eastern China, and to a lesser extent in Gansu, Ningxia, and Shaanxi. A famous Sini calligrapher is Hajji Noor Deen Mi Guangjiang.

Mosque Architecture began to follow traditional Chinese architecture. A good example is the Great Mosque of Xi'an, whose current buildings date from the Ming dynasty. Western Chinese mosques were more likely to incorporate minarets and domes while eastern Chinese mosques were more likely to look like pagodas.

In time, the Muslims who were descendants of immigrants from Muslim countries began to speak local dialects and to read in Chinese Language. The Ming policy towards the Islamic religion was tolerant. The Hongwu Emperor decreed the building of multiple mosques throughout China in many locations. A Nanjing mosque was built by the Xuanzong Emperor. Muslims in Ming dynasty Beijing were given relative freedom by the Chinese, with no restrictions placed on their religious practices or freedom of worship, were considered normal citizens in Beijing. In contrast to the freedom granted to Muslims, followers of Tibetan Buddhism and Catholicism suffered from restrictions and censure in Beijing.

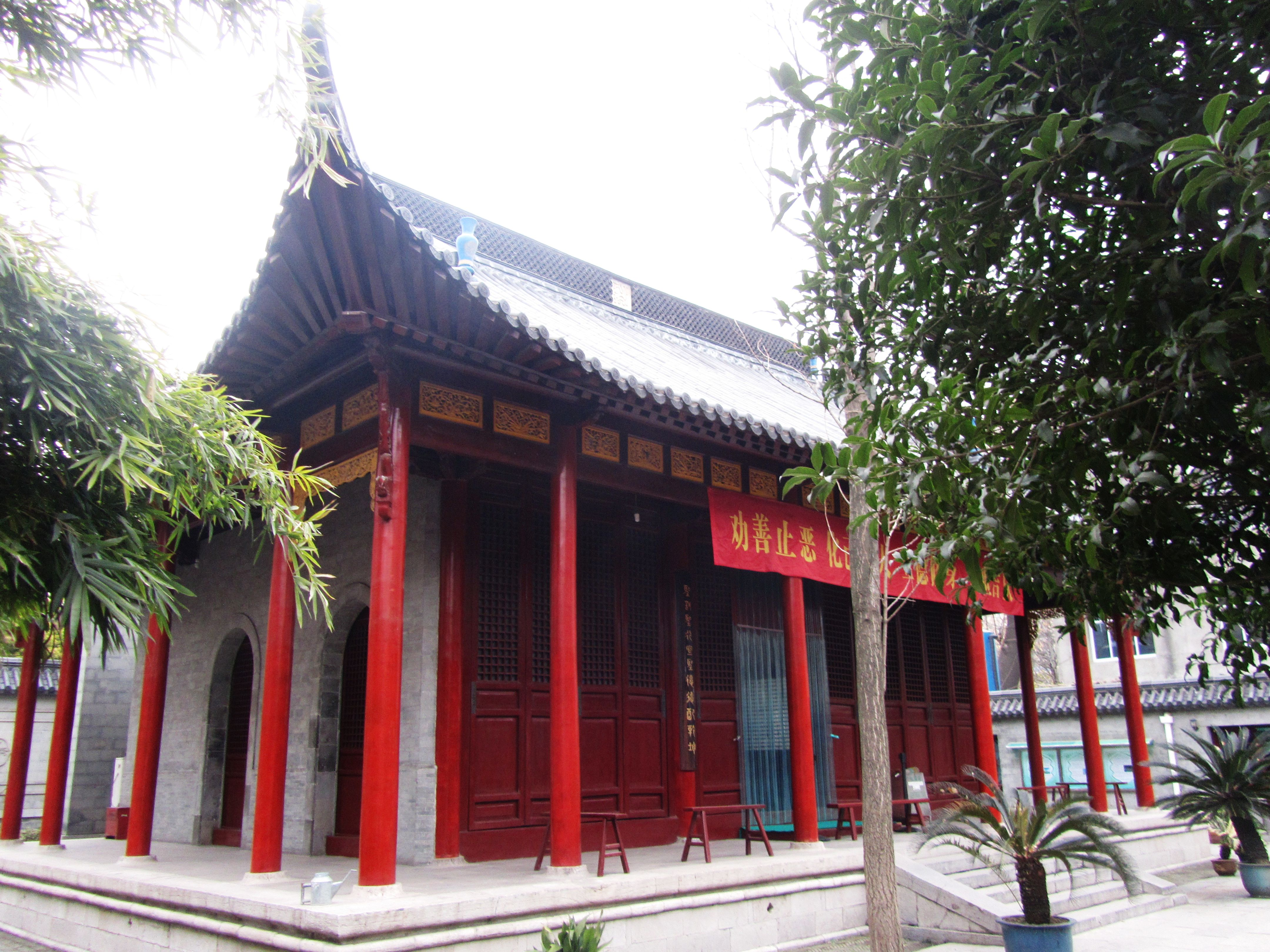
Jinjue Mosque (literally meaning: Pure Enlightenment Mosque) in Nanjing was constructed by the decree of the Hongwu Emperor.

The Hongwu Emperor ordered the building of several mosques in southern China, and wrote a 100 character praise on Islam, Allah and the prophet Muhammad. He had over 10 Muslim Generals in his military. The Emperor built mosques in Nanjing, Yunnan, Guangdong and Fujian. Zhu rebuilt Jin Jue mosque in Nanjing and large numbers of Hui Muslims moved to Nanjing during his rule. He ordered that inscriptions praising Muhammd be put into Mosques.

An incense burner with Sini-Arabic inscription "Muhammad is the Servant of Allah", made during the reign of Zhengde. Adilnor Collection, Sweden

During the war against the Mongols, among the Ming Emperor Zhu Yuanzhang's armies was the Hui Muslim Feng Sheng.

'Ali Akbar Khata'i wrote in his book Khataynameh: “the Emperor [Xiaozong- Hongzhi Emperor (1487-1505)] not only employed many Muslim officials but also had a marked personal inclination toward Islam…., The Kin Tay (Zhengde, r. 1505-1521) had been very friendly with the Muslims and had Muslim warlords under his service....., the eunuchs of the Chinese palace are all Muslims who can practice their faith without any limitations." He also called the Zhengde Emperor as "Khan".

1,200 Muslims who settled in China during the Yuan dynasty were sent "back" from Gansu to Sa-ma-rh-han (Samarkhand), due to a command from the Emperor to the Governor of Gansu to do so.

The Yongle Emperor called for the establishment and repair of Islamic mosques during his reign. Two mosques were built by him, one in Nanjing and the other in Xi'an and they still stand today. Repairs were encouraged and the mosques were not allowed to be converted to any other use.

Pro Muslim inscriptions were found on stelae erected by the Ming Emperors. The Fuzhou and Quanzhou mosques contain the following edict by the Emperor:

"I hereby give you my imperial decree in order to guard your residence. Officials, civil or military, or anyone, are not to offend or insult you. Anyone who offends or insults you against my imperial order will be punished as a criminal".

The Ming dynasty decreed that Manichaeism and Nestorian Christianity were illegal and heterodox, to be wiped out from China, while Islam and Judaism were legal and fit Confucian ideology.

Ming Taizu's tolerant disposition for Muslims and allowing them to practice their religion led to Arab missionaries continually coming to China during the Ming dynasty, prominent ones included Mahamode and Zhanmaluding (Muhammad and Jamal Ul-din respectively).

The Zhengde Emperor was fascinated by foreigners and invited many Muslims to serve as advisors, eunuchs, and envoys at his court. His court was reportedly full of Muslims, and artwork such as porcelain from his court contained Islamic inscriptions in Arabic or Persian. He was also said to wear Muslim clothing and alleged to have converted to Islam. Muslim eunuchs ran many of his state affairs.

When the Qing dynasty invaded the Ming dynasty in 1644, Muslim Ming loyalists led by Muslim leaders Milayin, Ding Guodong, and Ma Shouying led a revolt in 1646 against the Qing during the Milayin rebellion in order to drive the Qing out and restore the Ming Prince of Yanchang Zhu Shichuan to the throne as the emperor. The Muslim Ming loyalists were crushed by the Qing with 100,000 of them, including Milayin and Ding Guodong, killed.

== Muslim scholarship ==
The era saw Nanjing become an important center of Islamic study. From there Wang Daiyu wrote Zhengjiao zhenquan (A Commentary on the Orthodox Faith), while his successor, Liu Zhi, translated Tianfang xingli (Islamic Philosophy) Tianfang dianli (Islamic Ritual) and Tianfang zhisheng shilu (The Last Prophet of Islam). Another scholar, Hu Dengzhou started a rigorous Islamic school in Nanjing, which taught hadith, the Qur'an, and Islamic law. The school grew into a fourteen-course system, with classes in Arabic and Persian. Jingtang Jiaoyu was founded during the era of Hu Dengzhou 1522–1597. Other provinces had different systems and different specializations; Lintao and Hezhou provinces had a three-tier educational system in which the youngest children learned the Arabic required for namaz and wudu, and then graduated to more advanced studies. Shandong province became a center specialized in Persian texts. As the Hui Muslim community became more diluted, Chinese scholars worked harder to translate texts into Chinese to both provide more texts for Muslims to convince the ruling Han elite that Islam was not inferior to Confucianism.

The work of Islamic geographers which had reached China during the Yuan dynasty was used in the Ming dynasty to draw the Western Regions in the Da Ming Hun Yi Tu, the oldest surviving world map from East Asia.

== Prominent Muslims ==
Although the Yuan dynasty, unlike the western khanates, never converted to Islam, the Mongol rulers of the dynasty elevated the status of foreigners of all religions from Mongolia, Central, west Asia like Muslims, Jews, and Christians versus the Han, Khitan, and Jurchen, and placed many foreigners such as Central Asians, Jews, Nestorian Christian Naiman, Kerait, Ongud, Tibetan Buddhist Tangut Lamas, and Buddhist Turpan Uyghurs from Central and West Asia in high-ranking post. The state moved people from different parts of the empire including moving Chinese to Central Asia while moving Central Asians to China. The Mongol emperors moved many different peoples including Muslims to China while moved Chinese west to Muslim lands. Many worked in the elite circles arriving as provincial governors. They were referred to as Semu.

At the same time the Mongols imported Central Asian Muslims to serve as administrators in China, the Mongols also sent Han Chinese and Khitans from China to serve as administrators over the Muslim population in Bukhara in Central Asia, using foreigners to curtail the power of the local peoples of both lands.

=== Philosophy ===
Li Nu was a Han Chinese merchant and scholar, and the son of Li Lu in 1376 Li Nu visited Ormuz in Persia, converted to Islam, married a Persian or an Arab girl and brought her back to Quanzhou in Fujian. One of his descendants was the Neo Confucian philosopher Li Zhi who was not a Muslim, their clan stopped practising the religion during his grandfather's generation.

There was a significant amount of influence from Neo-Confucianism in Chinese Islamic thought around this time, to the point where many Muslims thought that they practiced Confucianism in a superior way to Confucianists who did not worship Allah. Buddhist and Taoist esotericism also influenced Muslim intellectuals.

=== Military generals ===
==== Disputed identities ====
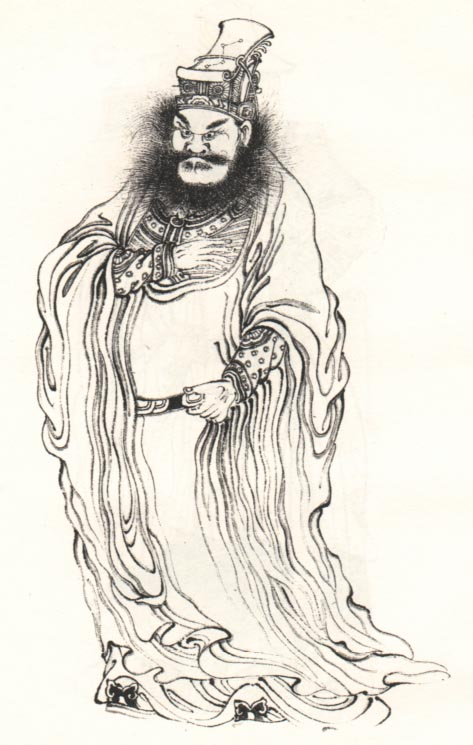
Hu Dahai was a general of the Hongwu Emperor.

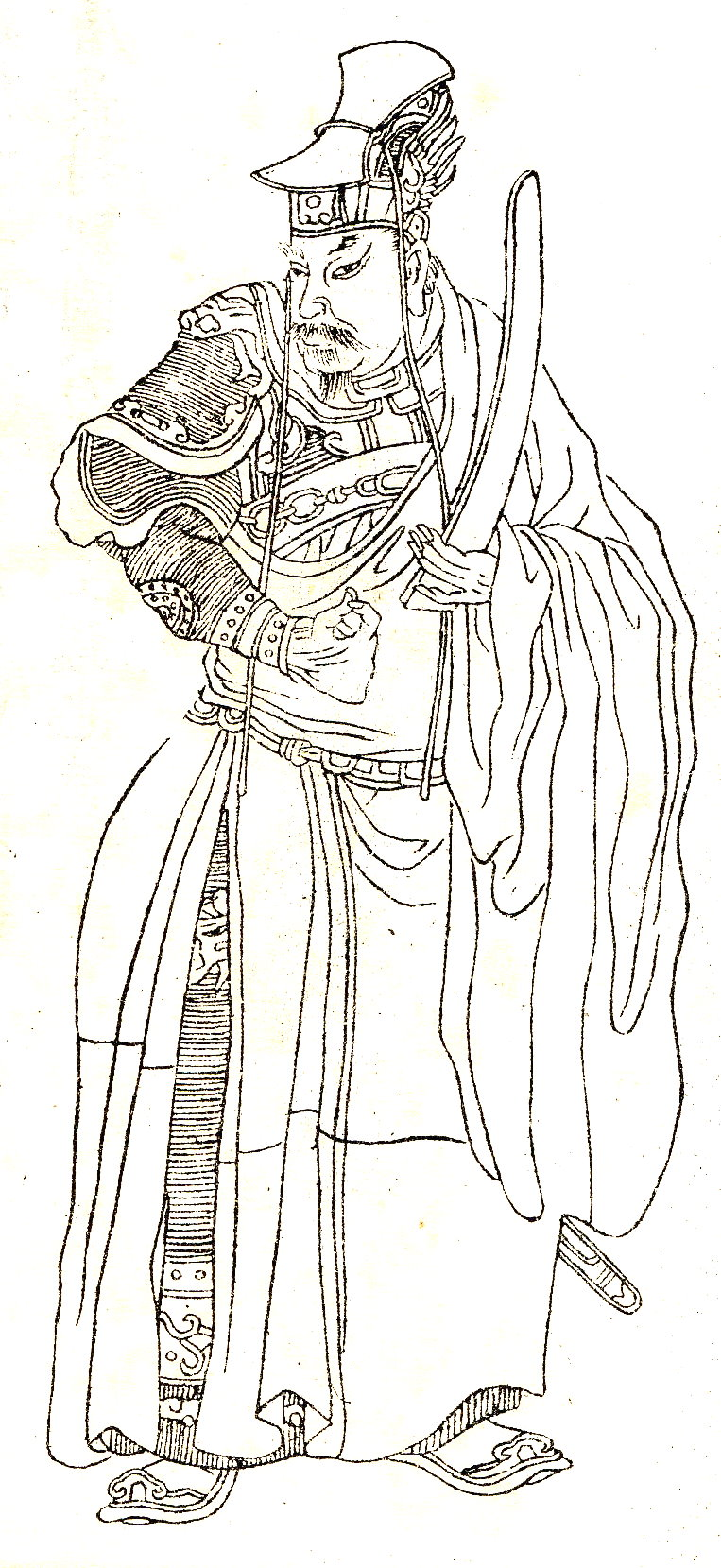
Chang Yuchun is said to be the father of the famous "Kaiping spear method".

Some Hui people claim that according to their oral legends that several of the commanders of Zhu Yuanzhang, the founder of the Ming dynasty, were Muslim like Lan Yu, Mu Ying. These are disputed by historians who say there is no evidence for them being Hui.

Lan Yu, in 1388, led a strong imperial Ming army out of the Great Wall and won a decisive victory over the Mongols in Mongolia, effectively ending the Mongol dream to re-conquer China. Lan Yu was later killed by the Emperor, along with several others, in a purge of those deemed to be a potential threat to his heir apparent.

Mu Ying was one of the few capable generals who survived the massacre of Emperor Zhu Yuanzhang. He and his descendants guarded Yunnan, a province near Vietnam, until the end of the Ming dynasty. He and other Muslim Generals loyal to the Ming dynasty led Muslim troops to defeat Mongol and Muslims loyal to the Yuan dynasty during the Ming conquest of Yunnan.

Other generals of the early Ming dynasty that the Hui community traditionally claimed to be Muslim include Feng Sheng, Ding Dexing and Hu Dahai.

The biographer of the imperial guard commander Ha Ming identified him as a Muslim, as his surname comes from his father's name Hajji. For his faithful protection of the Emperor Yingzong during his captivity under Esen Taishi, the Ming court granted him high rank and hereditary privileges.

==== Undisputed Hui officers ====
In the year 1447, a Muslim Hui general Chen You, financed the restoration of the Dong Si Mosque (literally meaning: Propagation of Brightness Mosque).

==== Zheng He ====
The Ming dynasty also gave rise to who is perhaps the most famous Chinese Muslim, Zheng He, a mariner, explorer, diplomat, and admiral. He was born in 1371 in Yunnan province. He served as a close confidant of the Yongle Emperor (r. 1403–1424), the third emperor of the Ming dynasty. Between 1405 and 1433, the Ming government sponsored a series of seven naval expeditions led by Zheng He into the Indian Ocean, reaching as far away as east Africa. On his voyages, he is known to have heavily subsidized Buddhist temples; upon his returns to China, he restored or constructed temples to Mazu, the Taoist sea goddess, in Nanjing, Taicang, and Nanshan, erecting steles praising her protection. Amateur historian Gavin Menzies claims that Zheng He traveled to West Africa, North America and South America, Greenland, Antarctica and Australia and most of the rest of the world, although this idea is not taken seriously by professional historians.

== Foreign policy ==
The Ming dynasty supported Muslim Sultanates in South East Asia like the Malacca Sultanate, protecting them from Thailand and the Portuguese, allowing them to prosper. It also supported the Muslim Champa state against Vietnam.

Ming dynasty China warned Thailand and the Majapahit against trying to conquer and attack the Malacca sultanate, placing the Malacca Sultanate under Chinese protection as a protectorate, and giving the ruler of Malacca the title of King. The Chinese strengthened several warehouses in Malacca. The Muslim Sultanate flourished due to the Chinese protection against the Thai and other powers who wanted to attack Malacca. Thailand was also a tributary to China and had to obey China's orders not to attack.

In response to the Portuguese Capture of Malacca (1511), the Chinese Imperial Government imprisoned and executed multiple Portuguese envoys after torturing them in Guangzhou. Since Malacca was a tributary state to China, the Chinese responded with violent force against the Portuguese. The Malaccans had informed the Chinese of the Portuguese seizure of Malacca, to which the Chinese responded with hostility toward the Portuguese. The Malaccans told the Chinese of the deception the Portuguese used, disguising plans for conquering territory as mere trading activities, and told of all the atrocities committed by the Portuguese. Malacca was under Chinese protection and the Portuguese invasion angered the Chinese.

Due to the Malaccan Sultan lodging a complaint against the Portuguese invasion to the Chinese Emperor, the Portuguese were greeted with hostility from the Chinese when they arrived in China. The Sultan's complaint caused "a great deal of trouble" to Portuguese in China. The Chinese were very "unwelcoming" to the Portuguese. The Malaccan Sultan, based in Bintan after fleeing Malacca, sent a message to the Chinese, which combined with Portuguese banditry and violent activity in China, led the Chinese authorities to execute 23 Portuguese and torture the rest of them in jails. Tomé Pires, a Portuguese trade envoy, was among those who died in the Chinese dungeons. Much of the Portuguese embassy stayed imprisoned for life.

== Ming loyalist Muslims ==
When the Qing dynasty invaded the Ming dynasty in 1644, Muslim Ming loyalists in Gansu led by Muslim leaders Milayin and Ding Guodong led a revolt in 1646 against the Qing during the Milayin rebellion in order to drive the Qing out and restore the Ming Prince of Yanchang Zhu Shichuan to the throne as the emperor. The Muslim Ming loyalists were supported by Hami's Sultan Sa'id Baba and his son Prince Turumtay. The Muslim Ming loyalists were joined by Tibetans and Han Chinese in the revolt. After fierce fighting, and negotiations, a peace agreement was agreed on in 1649, and Milayan and Ding nominally pledged allegiance to the Qing and were given ranks as members of the Qing military. When other Ming loyalists in southern China made a resurgence and the Qing were forced to withdraw their forces from Gansu to fight them, Milayan and Ding once again took up arms and rebelled against the Qing. The Muslim Ming loyalists were then crushed by the Qing with 100,000 of them, including Milayin, Ding Guodong, and Turumtay killed in battle.

The Confucian Hui Muslim scholar Ma Zhu (1640–1710) served with the southern Ming loyalists against the Qing. Zhu Yu'ai, the Ming Prince Gui was accompanied by Hui refugees when he fled from Huguang to the Burmese border in Yunnan and as a mark of their defiance against the Qing and loyalty to the Ming, they changed their surname to Ming.

In Guangzhou, there are three tombs of Ming loyalist Muslims who were martyred while fighting in battle against the Qing in the Manchu conquest of China in Guangzhou. The Ming Muslim loyalists were called "jiaomen sanzhong ("Three defenders of the faith" or "The Muslim's Loyal Trio").

== See also ==
- Islam during the Tang dynasty
- Islam during the Song dynasty
- Islam during the Yuan dynasty
- Islam during the Qing dynasty
- Religion in China
- The Hundred-word Eulogy

== Notes ==
- This article incorporates text from The preaching of Islam: a history of the propagation of the Muslim faith, by Sir Thomas Walker Arnold, a publication from 1896, now in the public domain in the United States.
- This article incorporates text from Mediæval Researches from Eastern Asiatic Sources: Fragments Toward the Knowledge of the Geography and History of Central and Western Asia from the 13th to the 17th Century, Volume 2, by E. Bretschneider, a publication from 1888, now in the public domain in the United States.
- Ring, Trudy; Salkin, Robert M.; La Boda, Sharon, eds. (1996). International Dictionary of Historic Places: Asia and Oceania. Vol. 5 of International Dictionary of Historic Places (illustrated, annotated ed.). Taylor & Francis. ISBN 978-1-884964-04-6.
