= Ozun Darreh =

Ozun Darreh or Ozundarreh or Owzun Darreh or Uzon Darreh or Uzondarreh or Oozoon Darreh or Owzown Darreh or Uzun Darreh (Persian: اوزن دره) may refer to:

- Ozun Darreh, Fars
- Owzun Darreh, Hamadan
- Owzun Darreh, Qazvin
- Uzun Darreh-ye Olya, West Azerbaijan province
- Uzun Darreh-ye Sofla, West Azerbaijan province
