= Gerd-e Yaqub =

Gerd-e Yaqub گرديعقوب
- Village
- Location within Iran
- Coordinates: 36°59′48″N 45°42′34″E
- Country: Iran
- Province: West Azerbaijan
- County: Mahabad
- Bakhsh: Central
- Rural District: Mokriyan-e Gharbi

Population (2006)
  - Total: 321
- Time zone: UTC+3:30 (IRST)
  - Summer (DST): UTC+4:30 (IRDT)

Gerd-e Yaqub (Persian: گرديعقوب, also Romanized as Gerd-e Ya‘qūb) is a village in Mokriyan-e Gharbi Rural District, in the Central District of Mahabad County, West Azerbaijan Province, Iran. At the 2006 census, its population was 321, in 62 families.
