= Darreh Lak =

Darreh Lak (Persian: دره لك) may refer to:

- Darreh Lak, Kohgiluyeh and Boyer-Ahmad
- Darreh Lak, West Azerbaijan
