= Pain Darreh =

Pain Darreh پائين دره
- Village
- Location within Iran
- Coordinates: 36°48′06″N 45°39′21″E
- Country: Iran
- Province: West Azerbaijan
- County: Mahabad
- Bakhsh: Central
- Rural District: Mokriyan-e Gharbi

Population (2006)
  - Total: 504
- Time zone: UTC+3:30 (IRST)
  - Summer (DST): UTC+4:30 (IRDT)

Pain Darreh (Persian: پائين دره, also Romanized as Pā’īn Darreh) is a village in Mokriyan-e Gharbi Rural District, in the Central District of Mahabad County, West Azerbaijan Province, Iran. At the 2006 census, its population was 504, in 69 families.
