= Chumelan =

Chumelan چوملان
- Village
- Location within Iran
- Coordinates: 36°51′19″N 45°37′24″E
- Country: Iran
- Province: West Azerbaijan
- County: Mahabad
- Bakhsh: Central
- Rural District: Mokriyan-e Gharbi

Population (2006)
  - Total: 154
- Time zone: UTC+3:30 (IRST)
  - Summer (DST): UTC+4:30 (IRDT)

Chumelan (Persian: چوملان, also Romanized as Chūmelān) is a village in Mokriyan-e Gharbi Rural District, in the Central District of Mahabad County, West Azerbaijan Province, Iran. At the 2006 census, its population was 154, in 31 families.
