= Tang-e Balekeh =

Tang-e Balekeh تنگ بالكه
- Village
- Location within Iran
- Coordinates: 36°52′29″N 45°57′04″E
- Country: Iran
- Province: West Azerbaijan
- County: Mahabad
- Bakhsh: Central
- Rural District: Mokriyan-e Sharqi

Population (2006)
  - Total: 163
- Time zone: UTC+3:30 (IRST)
  - Summer (DST): UTC+4:30 (IRDT)

Tang-e Balekeh (Persian: تنگ بالكه, also Romanized as Tang-e Bālekeh) is a village in Mokriyan-e Sharqi Rural District, in the Central District of Mahabad County, West Azerbaijan Province, Iran. At the 2006 census, its population was 163, in 35 families.
