= Salim Saghul =

Salim Saghul سليم ساغول
- Village
- Location within Iran
- Coordinates: 36°40′02″N 45°35′46″E
- Country: Iran
- Province: West Azerbaijan
- County: Mahabad
- Bakhsh: Central
- Rural District: Mokriyan-e Gharbi

Population (2006)
  - Total: 225
- Time zone: UTC+3:30 (IRST)
  - Summer (DST): UTC+4:30 (IRDT)

Salim Saghul (Persian: سليم ساغول, also Romanized as Salīm Sāghūl; also known as Salīm Sāghlū and Salīmsāghlū) is a village in Mokriyan-e Gharbi Rural District, in the Central District of Mahabad County, West Azerbaijan Province, Iran. At the 2006 census, its population was 225, in 37 families.
