= Khatunkhas =

Khatunkhas خاتون خاص
- Village
- Location within Iran
- Coordinates: 36°45′56″N 45°57′18″E
- Country: Iran
- Province: West Azerbaijan
- County: Mahabad
- Bakhsh: Central
- Rural District: Akhtachi-ye Gharbi

Population (2006)
  - Total: 183
- Time zone: UTC+3:30 (IRST)
  - Summer (DST): UTC+4:30 (IRDT)

Khatunkhas (Persian: خاتون خاص, also Romanized as Khātūnkhāş; also known as Khātūkās) is a village in Akhtachi-ye Gharbi Rural District, in the Central District of Mahabad County, West Azerbaijan Province, Iran. At the 2006 census, its population was 183, in 35 families.
