= Mokriyan =

Mokriyan (Persian: مكريان) may refer to:

- Mokriyan-e Gharbi Rural District
- Mokriyan-e Sharqi Rural District
- Mokriyan-e Shomali Rural District
