= Kapeh Kand =

Kapeh Kand كپه كند
- Village
- Location within Iran
- Coordinates: 36°46′51″N 45°52′22″E
- Country: Iran
- Province: West Azerbaijan
- County: Mahabad
- Bakhsh: Central
- Rural District: Akhtachi-ye Gharbi

Population (2006)
  - Total: 217
- Time zone: UTC+3:30 (IRST)
  - Summer (DST): UTC+4:30 (IRDT)

Kapeh Kand (Persian: كپه كند) is a village in Akhtachi-ye Gharbi Rural District, in the Central District of Mahabad County, West Azerbaijan Province, Iran. At the 2006 census, its population was 217, in 38 families.
