= Kowtar =

Kowtar کوتر
- Village
- Location within Iran
- Coordinates: 36°42′10″N 45°36′59″E
- Country: Iran
- Province: West Azerbaijan
- County: Mahabad
- Bakhsh: Central
- Rural District: Mokriyan-e Gharbi

Population (2006)
  - Total: 261
- Time zone: UTC+3:30 (IRST)
  - Summer (DST): UTC+4:30 (IRDT)

Kowtar (Persian: کوتر) is a village located in Mokriyan-e Gharbi Rural District, in the Central District of Mahabad County, West Azerbaijan Province, Iran. At the time of the 2006 census, its population was 261, in 36 families.
