= Kohneh Deh =

Kohneh Deh (Persian: كهنه ده) may refer to:

- Kohneh Deh, Alborz
- Kohneh Deh, Nowshahr, Mazandaran Province
- Kohneh Deh, Sari, Mazandaran Province
- Kohneh Deh, West Azerbaijan
- Kohneh Deh, Akhtachi-ye Gharbi, West Azerbaijan Province
