= Khata'i =

Khata'i or Khatai may refer to:

== People ==
- the pen name of Ismail I (1487–1524), poet, and first shah of Safavid Iran
- 'Ali Akbar Khata'i, early 16th-century Persian traveler and writer

== Places ==
- Khatai, Iran
- Xətai (disambiguation)
- Shah Ismail Khatai (Baku Metro), in Baku

== See also ==
- Nankhatai, shortbread biscuits originating in the Indian subcontinent
