= Yadabad =

Yadabad (Persian: ياداباد) may refer to:

- Yadabad-e Olya
- Yadabad-e Sofla
