= Qarrah Dagh =

Qarrah Dagh or Qareh Dagh or Qarah Dagh (Persian: قره داغ) may refer to:

- Qarah Dagh, Bukan, West Azerbaijan Province
- Qarah Dagh, Mahabad, West Azerbaijan Province
- Qarrah Dagh, Zanjan
