= Qojiabad =

Qojiabad قجي اباد
- Village
- Location within Iran
- Coordinates: 36°55′47″N 45°44′50″E
- Country: Iran
- Province: West Azerbaijan
- County: Mahabad
- Bakhsh: Central
- Rural District: Mokriyan-e Gharbi

Population (2006)
  - Total: 305
- Time zone: UTC+3:30 (IRST)
  - Summer (DST): UTC+4:30 (IRDT)

Qojiabad (Persian: قجي اباد, also Romanized as Qojīābād) is a village in Mokriyan-e Gharbi Rural District, in the Central District of Mahabad County, West Azerbaijan Province, Iran. At the 2006 census, its population was 305, in 56 families.
