= Tut Aghaj =

Tut Aghaj توت اغاج
- Village
- Location within Iran
- Coordinates: 36°51′47″N 45°41′09″E
- Country: Iran
- Province: West Azerbaijan
- County: Mahabad
- Bakhsh: Central
- Rural District: Mokriyan-e Gharbi

Population (2006)
  - Total: 237
- Time zone: UTC+3:30 (IRST)
  - Summer (DST): UTC+4:30 (IRDT)

Tut Aghaj (Persian: توت اغاج, also Romanized as Tūt Āghāj; also known as Tut-agach) is a village in Mokriyan-e Gharbi Rural District, in the Central District of Mahabad County, West Azerbaijan Province, Iran. At the 2006 census, its population was 237, in 38 families.
