= Selakeh =

Selakeh سلكه
- Village
- Location within Iran
- Coordinates: 36°49′53″N 45°35′46″E
- Country: Iran
- Province: West Azerbaijan
- County: Mahabad
- Bakhsh: Central
- Rural District: Mokriyan-e Gharbi

Population (2006)
  - Total: 109
- Time zone: UTC+3:30 (IRST)
  - Summer (DST): UTC+4:30 (IRDT)

Selakeh (Persian: سلكه; also known as Seh Lakeh) is a village in Mokriyan-e Gharbi Rural District, in the Central District of Mahabad County, West Azerbaijan Province, Iran. At the 2006 census, its population was 109, in 20 families.
