= Tekanlujeh =

Tekanlujeh تكان لوجه
- Village
- Location within Iran
- Coordinates: 36°49′15″N 45°48′30″E
- Country: Iran
- Province: West Azerbaijan
- County: Mahabad
- Bakhsh: Central
- Rural District: Akhtachi-ye Gharbi

Population (2006)
  - Total: 188
- Time zone: UTC+3:30 (IRST)
  - Summer (DST): UTC+4:30 (IRDT)

Tekanlujeh (Persian: تكان لوجه, also Romanized as Tekānlūjeh; also known as Tīkān Lūjeh) is a village in Akhtachi-ye Gharbi Rural District, in the Central District of Mahabad County, West Azerbaijan Province, Iran. At the 2006 census, its population was 188, in 37 families.
