= Dustali =

Dustali دوستعلي
- Village
- Location within Iran
- Coordinates: 36°48′25″N 45°46′55″E
- Country: Iran
- Province: West Azerbaijan
- County: Mahabad
- Bakhsh: Central
- Rural District: Akhtachi-ye Gharbi

Population (2006)
  - Total: 424
- Time zone: UTC+3:30 (IRST)
  - Summer (DST): UTC+4:30 (IRDT)

Dustali (Persian: دوستعلي, also Romanized as Dūst‘alī, Dowst ‘Alī, Dūst ‘Alī; also known as Dost Ali) is a village in Akhtachi-ye Gharbi Rural District, in the Central District of Mahabad County, West Azerbaijan Province, Iran. At the 2006 census, its population was 424, in 98 families.
