= Ebrahimeh =

Ebrahimeh ابراهيمه
- Village
- Interactive map of Ebrahimeh
- Country: Iran
- Province: West Azerbaijan
- County: Mahabad
- Bakhsh: Central
- Rural District: Mokriyan-e Gharbi

Population (2006)
  - Total: 278
- Time zone: UTC+3:30 (IRST)
  - Summer (DST): UTC+4:30 (IRDT)

Ebrahimeh (Persian: ابراهيمه, also Romanized as Ebrāhīmeh) is a village in Mokriyan-e Gharbi Rural District, in the Central District of Mahabad County, West Azerbaijan Province, Iran. At the 2006 census, its population was 278, in 43 families.
