= Saholan Cave =

Cave in Iran

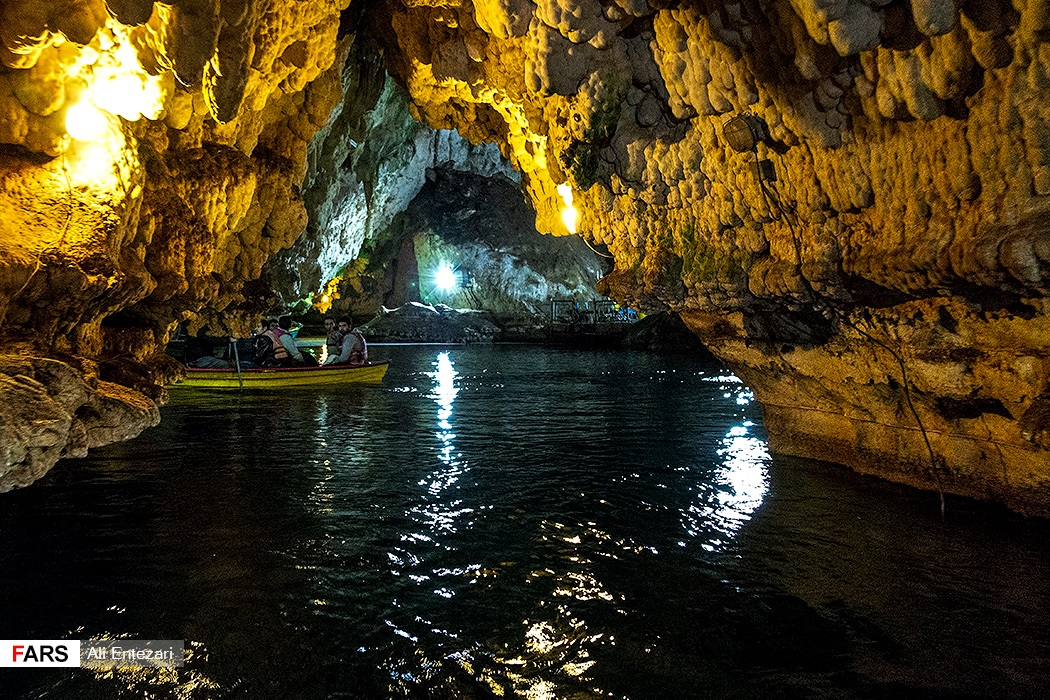
Saholan Cave.

Saholan Cave is in Saholan village, 42 km southeast of Mahabad city, Borhan Road, and Isa Kand Village. It is located between Mahabad city and 25 km away from Bukan city.

Saholan means ice in Kurdish and the local people also, call the cave of "Kune Kotar" which means pigeon nest because of the existence of many pigeon nests inside the cave. The cave is on the list of national natural monuments of Iran.

Saholan Cave is in Saholan village, 42 km southeast of Mahabad city, Borhan Road, and Isa Kand Village. It is located between Mahabad city and 25 km away from Bukan city.

Saholan means ice in Kurdish and the local people also call the cave "Kune Kotar" which means pigeon nest because of the existence of many pigeon nests inside the cave. The cave is on the list of national natural monuments of Iran.

== History ==
The date of when the cave was discovered is not known yet, because there have always been villages and residential areas around it, and people have always used it as a shelter and a place for hunting. But Jacques Demorgan and the villagers of Saholan, built a small wooden boat and were traveling on the water when they saw a cave and sketched that on a map. Today it is said to be 60% true to the current reality of the cave's location.

However, so far, about 250 meters from the land area and 300 meters from the water area of this beautiful cave has been discovered.

Saholan Cave has a lake inside which sometimes reaches a depth of about 60 meters. The cave's height from the lake floor is about 50 meters. The temperature inside of the cave is about 15 degrees cooler than the temperature outside of the cave. It is between 5-10 degrees Celsius. Saholan Cave is one of the largest water caves in Iran and boating on its lake is one of the most attractive attractions of this cave. The water of these lakes is supplied from underground aquifers and simmering water fountains. Saholan Cave has two entrances, one of which is the main entrance. At the main entrance of the cave, about 100 concrete steps have been installed to make it easier to enter it.

== Features of Saholan Cave ==
The roof of the cave to the level of the lake reaches 50 meters and the water depth in some places reaches 30 meters. The temperature difference between inside and outside the cave is between 10 and 15 degrees.

- Geological structure of the cave: aquatic-earthy-limestone
- Length of discovered water route: 300 meters
- Length of discovered land route: 250 meters
- Discovered area: about 2 hectares
- Average water depth: 22 meters
- Maximum water depth: 62 meters
- Humidity: 70 to 75 percent
- Temperature inside the cave: 5 to 10 degrees Celsius
- Type of sediments: calcareous
- Main hall area: 58 meters by 42 meters
- Cave roof height: 50 meters
- In-well creatures: pigeons and bats
