= Sarvaneh =

Sarvaneh ساروانه
- Village
- Location within Iran
- Coordinates: 36°44′12″N 45°48′57″E
- Country: Iran
- Province: West Azerbaijan
- County: Mahabad
- Bakhsh: Central
- Rural District: Akhtachi-ye Gharbi

Population (2006)
  - Total: 63
- Time zone: UTC+3:30 (IRST)
  - Summer (DST): UTC+4:30 (IRDT)

Sarvaneh (Persian: ساروانه, also Romanized as Sārvāneh; also known as Sārbānān) is a village in Akhtachi-ye Gharbi Rural District, in the Central District of Mahabad County, West Azerbaijan Province, Iran. At the 2006 census, its population was 63, in 10 families.
