= Sichan Bolaghi =

Sichan Bolaghi سی‌چان‌بلاغی
- village
- Location within Iran
- Coordinates: 36°40′49″N 45°55′58″E
- Country: Iran
- Province: West Azerbaijan
- County: Mahabad
- Bakhsh: Central
- Rural District: Akhtachi-ye Gharbi

Population (2006)
  - Total: 53
- Time zone: UTC+3:30 (IRST)
  - Summer (DST): UTC+4:30 (IRDT)

Sichan Bolaghi (Persian: سی‌چان‌بلاغی, also Romanized as Sīchān Bolāghī; also known as Sechān Bolāghī and Sīchān Bolāgh) is a village in Akhtachi-ye Gharbi Rural District, in the Central District of Mahabad County, West Azerbaijan Province, Iran. At the 2006 census, its population was 53, in 10 families.
