= Uzun Darreh-ye Olya =

Village in West Azerbaijan, Iran

Uzun Darreh-ye Olya اوزون دره عليا
- Village
- Location within Iran
- Coordinates: 36°41′47″N 45°46′15″E
- Country: Iran
- Province: West Azerbaijan
- County: Mahabad
- Bakhsh: Central
- Rural District: Akhtachi-ye Gharbi

Population (2006)
  - Total: 173
- Time zone: UTC+3:30 (IRST)
  - Summer (DST): UTC+4:30 (IRDT)

Uzun Darreh-ye Olya (Persian: اوزون دره عليا, also Romanized as Ūzūn Darreh-ye ‘Olyā; also known as Ūzondarreh ‘Olyā, Ūzūn Darreh, Ūzūn Darreh Bālā, Ūzūn Darreh-ye Bālā, and Uzur Darreh) is a village in Akhtachi-ye Gharbi Rural District, in the Central District of Mahabad County, West Azerbaijan Province, Iran. At the 2006 census, its population was 173, in 22 families.
