= Khaneqah-e Khangeh =

Neighborhood in West Azerbaijan province, Iran

Khaneqah-e Khangeh Persian: خانقاه خانگه
- Neighborhood
- Location within Iran
- Coordinates: 36°48′39″N 45°44′32″E
- Country: Iran
- Province: West Azerbaijan
- County: Mahabad
- District: Central
- City: Mahabad

Population (2016)
  - Total: 4,736
- Time zone: UTC+3:30 (IRST)

Khaneqah-e Khangeh (Persian: خانقاه خانگه) (Note: Also romanized as Khāneqāh-e Khāngeh; also known as Khāneqāh) is a neighborhood in the city of Mahabad in the Central District of Mahabad County, West Azerbaijan province, Iran.

== Demographics ==
=== Population ===
At the time of the 2006 National Census, Khaneqah-e Khangeh's population was 1,832 in 418 households, when it was a village in Mokriyan-e Gharbi Rural District. The following census in 2011 counted 3,357 people in 873 households. The 2016 census measured the population of the village as 4,736 people in 1,322 households. It was the most populous village in its rural district.

Khaneqah-e Khangeh was annexed by the city of Mahabad in 2021.
