= Yadabad-e Sofla =

Yadabad-e Sofla يادابادسفلي
- Village
- Location within Iran
- Coordinates: 36°40′45″N 45°59′47″E
- Country: Iran
- Province: West Azerbaijan
- County: Mahabad
- Bakhsh: Central
- Rural District: Akhtachi-ye Gharbi

Population (2006)
  - Total: 86
- Time zone: UTC+3:30 (IRST)
  - Summer (DST): UTC+4:30 (IRDT)

Yadabad-e Sofla (Persian: يادابادسفلي, also Romanized as Yādābād-e Soflá; also known as Yādābād) is a village in Akhtachi-ye Gharbi Rural District, in the Central District of Mahabad County, West Azerbaijan Province, Iran. At the 2006 census, its population was 86, in 20 families.
