= Utmish =

Village in West Azerbaijan province, Iran

Utmish Persian: اوطميش
- Village
- Location within Iran
- Coordinates: 36°40′25″N 46°02′03″E
- Country: Iran
- Province: West Azerbaijan
- County: Mahabad
- District: Central
- Rural District: Akhtachi-ye Gharbi

Population (2016)
  - Total: 315
- Time zone: UTC+3:30 (IRST)

Utmish (Persian: اوطميش) (Note: Also romanized as Ūţmīsh; also known as Ūţmesh) is a village in Akhtachi-ye Gharbi Rural District of the Central District in Mahabad County, West Azerbaijan province, Iran.

== Demographics ==
=== Population ===
At the time of the 2006 National Census, the village's population was 394 in 70 households. The following census in 2011 counted 365 people in 70 households. The 2016 census measured the population of the village as 315 people in 64 households.
