= Yadabad-e Olya =

Yadabad-e Olya يادابادعليا
- Village
- Location within Iran
- Coordinates: 36°40′38″N 45°59′08″E
- Country: Iran
- Province: West Azerbaijan
- County: Mahabad
- Bakhsh: Central
- Rural District: Akhtachi-ye Gharbi

Population (2006)
  - Total: 95
- Time zone: UTC+3:30 (IRST)
  - Summer (DST): UTC+4:30 (IRDT)

Yadabad-e Olya (Persian: يادابادعليا, also Romanized as Yādābād-e Olyá) is a village in Akhtachi-ye Gharbi Rural District, in the Central District of Mahabad County, West Azerbaijan Province, Iran. At the 2006 census, its population was 95, in 17 families.
