= Qarah Khan, West Azerbaijan =

Village in West Azerbaijan province, Iran

Qarah Khan Persian: قره خان
- Village
- Location within Iran
- Coordinates: 36°52′37″N 45°46′42″E
- Country: Iran
- Province: West Azerbaijan
- County: Mahabad
- District: Central
- Rural District: Mokriyan-e Gharbi

Population (2016)
  - Total: 778
- Time zone: UTC+3:30 (IRST)

Qarah Khan (Persian: قره خان) (Note: Also romanized as Qarah Khān and Qareh Khān) is a village in Mokriyan-e Gharbi Rural District of the Central District in Mahabad County, West Azerbaijan province, Iran.

== Demographics ==
=== Population ===
At the time of the 2006 National Census, the village's population was 637 in 102 households. The following census in 2011 counted 780 people in 196 households. The 2016 census measured the population of the village as 778 people in 192 households.
