= Qapi-ye Baba Ali =

Village in West Azerbaijan province, Iran

Qapi-ye Baba Ali Persian: قپي باباعلي
- Village
- Location within Iran
- Coordinates: 36°56′48″N 45°54′24″E
- Country: Iran
- Province: West Azerbaijan
- County: Mahabad
- District: Central
- Rural District: Mokriyan-e Sharqi

Population (2016)
  - Total: 504
- Time zone: UTC+3:30 (IRST)

Qapi-ye Baba Ali (Persian: قپي باباعلي) (Note: Also romanized as Qapī-ye Bābā ‘Alī; also known as Kopeh-ye Bābā ‘Alī, Kopi-Bāb ‘Ali, Koppeh Bābā ‘Alī, Koppeh-ye Bābā ‘Alī, Qopī Bāb ‘Alī, Qowbī-ye Bābā ‘Alī, and Qowpī-ye Bābā ‘Alī) is a village in Mokriyan-e Sharqi Rural District of the Central District in Mahabad County, West Azerbaijan province, Iran.

== Demographics ==
=== Population ===
At the time of the 2006 National Census, the village's population was 597 in 118 households. The following census in 2011 counted 532 people in 130 households. The 2016 census measured the population of the village as 504 people in 132 households.
