= Deh Bekr =

Village in West Azerbaijan province, Iran

Deh Bekr Persian: دهبکر
- Village
- Location within Iran
- Coordinates: 36°42′44″N 45°35′43″E
- Country: Iran
- Province: West Azerbaijan
- County: Mahabad
- District: Central
- Rural District: Mokriyan-e Gharbi

Population (2016)
  - Total: 557
- Time zone: UTC+3:30 (IRST)

Deh Bekr (Persian: دهبکر) (Note: Also romanized as Dehbokar) is a village in Mokriyan-e Gharbi Rural District of the Central District in Mahabad County, West Azerbaijan province, Iran.

== Demographics ==
=== Population ===
At the time of the 2006 National Census, the village's population was 539 in 82 households. The following census in 2011 counted 593 people in 168 households. The 2016 census measured the population of the village as 557 people in 102 households.
