= Uzun Darreh-ye Sofla =

Uzun Darreh-ye Sofla اوزون دره سفلي
- Village
- Location within Iran
- Coordinates: 36°43′00″N 45°46′00″E
- Country: Iran
- Province: West Azerbaijan
- County: Mahabad
- Bakhsh: Central
- Rural District: Akhtachi-ye Gharbi

Population (2006)
  - Total: 260
- Time zone: UTC+3:30 (IRST)
  - Summer (DST): UTC+4:30 (IRDT)

Uzun Darreh-ye Sofla (Persian: اوزون دره سفلي, also Romanized as Ūzūn Darreh-ye Soflá and Oozoon Darreh Sofla; also known as Ūzūn Darreh-ye Pā’īn) is a village in Akhtachi-ye Gharbi Rural District, in the Central District of Mahabad County, West Azerbaijan Province, Iran. At the 2006 census, its population was 260, in 41 families.
