= Kohneh Deh Dum =

Kohneh Deh Dum كهنه ده دوم
- Village
- Location within Iran
- Coordinates: 36°42′24″N 45°46′46″E
- Country: Iran
- Province: West Azerbaijan
- County: Mahabad
- Bakhsh: Central
- Rural District: Akhtachi-ye Gharbi

Population (2006)
  - Total: 32
- Time zone: UTC+3:30 (IRST)
  - Summer (DST): UTC+4:30 (IRDT)

Kohneh Deh Dum (Persian: كهنه ده دوم, also Romanized as Kohneh Deh Dūm; also known as Kohneh Deh) is a village in Akhtachi-ye Gharbi Rural District, in the Central District of Mahabad County, West Azerbaijan Province, Iran. At the 2006 census, its population was 32, in 9 families.
