= Qomqaleh =

Village in West Azerbaijan province, Iran

Qomqaleh Persian: قمقلعه
- Village
- Location within Iran
- Coordinates: 36°51′48″N 45°45′18″E
- Country: Iran
- Province: West Azerbaijan
- County: Mahabad
- District: Central
- Rural District: Mokriyan-e Gharbi

Population (2016)
  - Total: 3,038
- Time zone: UTC+3:30 (IRST)

Qomqaleh (Persian: قمقلعه) (Note: Also romanized as Qom Qal‘eh and Qomqal‘eh) is a village in Mokriyan-e Gharbi Rural District of the Central District in Mahabad County, West Azerbaijan province, Iran.

== Demographics ==
=== Population ===
At the time of the 2006 National Census, the village's population was 2,572 in 552 households. The following census in 2011 counted 2,976 people in 752 households. The 2016 census measured the population of the village as 3,038 people in 862 households.
