= Kichabad =

Village in West Azerbaijan province, Iran

Kichabad Persian: كيچ اباد
- Village
- Location within Iran
- Coordinates: 36°55′50″N 45°47′28″E
- Country: Iran
- Province: West Azerbaijan
- County: Mahabad
- District: Central
- Rural District: Mokriyan-e Sharqi

Population (2016)
  - Total: 533
- Time zone: UTC+3:30 (IRST)

Kichabad (Persian: كيچ اباد) (Note: Also romanized as Kīchābād; also known as Kīkābād, Sorani Kurdish: کێچاوا Kichava, and Kurdish: Kêçawa) is a village in Mokriyan-e Sharqi Rural District of the Central District in Mahabad County, West Azerbaijan province, Iran.

== Demographics ==
=== Population ===
At the time of the 2006 National Census, the village's population was 522 in 83 households. The following census in 2011 counted 550 people in 125 households. The 2016 census measured the population of the village as 533 people in 130 households.
