= Khatai, Iran =

Khatai خطایی
- Village
- Location within Iran
- Coordinates: 36°51′23″N 46°02′22″E
- Country: Iran
- Province: West Azerbaijan
- County: Mahabad
- Bakhsh: Central
- Rural District: Mokriyan-e Sharqi

Population (2006)
  - Total: 398
- Time zone: UTC+3:30 (IRST)
  - Summer (DST): UTC+4:30 (IRDT)

Khatai (Persian: خطایی, Sorani Kurdish: خەتایی; also Romanized as Khaţā'ī) is a village in Mokriyan-e Sharqi Rural District, in the Central District of Mahabad County, West Azerbaijan Province, Iran. At the 2006 census, its population was 398, in 70 families.
