= Xətai =

Xətai may refer to the following places in Azerbaijan:

- Xətai raion, in Baku
- Xətai, Agstafa
- Xətai, Nakhchivan

== See also ==
- Khata'i (disambiguation)
