= Deryaz =

Village in West Azerbaijan province, Iran

Deryaz Persian: درياز
- Village
- Location within Iran
- Coordinates: 36°51′34″N 45°43′23″E
- Country: Iran
- Province: West Azerbaijan
- County: Mahabad
- District: Central
- Rural District: Mokriyan-e Gharbi

Population (2016)
  - Total: 2,334
- Time zone: UTC+3:30 (IRST)

Deryaz (Persian: درياز) (Note: Also romanized as Deryāz; also known as Deryās) is a village in, and the capital of, Mokriyan-e Gharbi Rural District in the Central District of Mahabad County, West Azerbaijan province, Iran.

== Demographics ==
=== Population ===
At the time of the 2006 National Census, the village's population was 1,605 in 300 households. The following census in 2011 counted 1,810 people in 397 households. The 2016 census measured the population of the village as 2,334 people in 610 households.
