= Khatunbagh =

Village in West Azerbaijan province, Iran

Khatunbagh Persian: خاتون باغ
- Village
- Location within Iran
- Coordinates: 36°49′26″N 45°50′44″E
- Country: Iran
- Province: West Azerbaijan
- County: Mahabad
- District: Central
- Rural District: Akhtachi-ye Gharbi

Population (2016)
  - Total: 446
- Time zone: UTC+3:30 (IRST)

Khatunbagh (Persian: خاتون باغ) (Note: Also romanized as Khātūn Bāgh and Khātūnbāgh) is a village in Akhtachi-ye Gharbi Rural District of the Central District in Mahabad County, West Azerbaijan province, Iran.

== Demographics ==
=== Population ===
At the time of the 2006 National Census, the village's population was 552 in 103 households. The following census in 2011 counted 558 people in 123 households. The 2016 census measured the population of the village as 446 people in 108 households.
