= Hajji Khvosh =

Village in West Azerbaijan province, Iran

Hajji Khvosh Persian: حاجي خوش
- Village
- Location within Iran
- Coordinates: 36°54′51″N 45°48′04″E
- Country: Iran
- Province: West Azerbaijan
- County: Mahabad
- District: Central
- Rural District: Mokriyan-e Sharqi

Population (2016)
  - Total: 1,047
- Time zone: UTC+3:30 (IRST)

Hajji Khvosh (Persian: حاجي خوش) (Note: Also romanized as Ḩājjī Khvosh; also known as Ḩajjt Khowsh) is a village in Mokriyan-e Sharqi Rural District of the Central District in Mahabad County, West Azerbaijan province, Iran.

== Demographics ==
=== Population ===
At the time of the 2006 National Census, the village's population was 907 in 144 households. The following census in 2011 counted 986 people in 222 households. The 2016 census measured the population of the village as 1,047 people in 251 households.
