= Hajji Ali Kand =

Village in West Azerbaijan province, Iran

Hajji Ali Kand Persian: حاجي آلی كند
- Village
- Location within Iran
- Coordinates: 36°45′21″N 45°55′35″E
- Country: Iran
- Province: West Azerbaijan
- County: Mahabad
- District: Central
- Rural District: Akhtachi-ye Gharbi

Population (2016)
  - Total: 633
- Time zone: UTC+3:30 (IRST)

Hajji Ali Kand (Persian: حاجي علي كند) (Note: Also romanized as Ḩājjī ‘Alī Kand; also known as Hāj‘alī Kand, Hāji ‘Ali Khān, Ḩājj’alī Kand, and Ḩājjī ‘Alī Kandī) is a village in Akhtachi-ye Gharbi Rural District of the Central District in Mahabad County, West Azerbaijan province, Iran.

== Demographics ==
=== Population ===
At the time of the 2006 National Census, the village's population was 765 in 110 households. The following census in 2011 counted 842 people in 140 households. The 2016 census measured the population of the village as 633 people in 133 households.
