= Khorkhora =

Khorkhora (Persian: خرخرا) may refer to:

- Khorkhora, East Azerbaijan
- Khorkhora, West Azerbaijan
