= Gerdeh Rash, Mahabad =

Gerdeh Rash گرده رش
- Village
- Location within Iran
- Coordinates: 36°52′58″N 46°00′31″E
- Country: Iran
- Province: West Azerbaijan
- County: Mahabad
- Bakhsh: Central
- Rural District: Mokriyan-e Sharqi

Population (2006)
  - Total: 371
- Time zone: UTC+3:30 (IRST)
  - Summer (DST): UTC+4:30 (IRDT)

Gerdeh Rash (Persian: گرده رش) is a village in Mokriyan-e Sharqi Rural District, in the Central District of Mahabad County, West Azerbaijan Province, Iran. At the 2006 census, its population was 371, in 64 families.
