= Egriqash =

Village in West Azerbaijan province, Iran

Egriqash Persian: اگريقاش
- Village
- Location within Iran
- Coordinates: 36°50′18″N 45°45′42″E
- Country: Iran
- Province: West Azerbaijan
- County: Mahabad
- District: Central
- Rural District: Mokriyan-e Gharbi

Population (2016)
  - Total: 3,721
- Time zone: UTC+3:30 (IRST)

Egriqash (Persian: اگريقاش) (Note: Also romanized as Egrīqāsh; also known as Garīfāsh and Kurdish: Indergash (ئیندرقاش)) is a village in Mokriyan-e Gharbi Rural District of the Central District in Mahabad County, West Azerbaijan province, Iran.

== Demographics ==
=== Population ===
At the time of the 2006 National Census, the village's population was 2,911 in 578 households. The following census in 2011 counted 3,332 people in 735 households. The 2016 census measured the population of the village as 3,721 people in 1,033 households.

== Etymology ==
Historically, the name of this village was Indirqash, of unknown origin, which was transformed by folk etymology into Azeri Turkish Ägri-qash ("crooked eyebrow") or Hündür-qash ("high eyebrow").

== History ==
After the Iranian Revolution in 1979, Shia Azerbaijani recruits in the Islamic Revolutionary Guard Corps entered Egriqash and massacred the local Kurdish population.
