= Kuseh Kahriz =

Village in West Azerbaijan province, Iran

Kuseh Kahriz Persian: كوسه كهريز
- Village
- Location within Iran
- Coordinates: 36°55′16″N 45°39′36″E
- Country: Iran
- Province: West Azerbaijan
- County: Mahabad
- District: Central
- Rural District: Mokriyan-e Gharbi

Population (2016)
  - Total: 1,940
- Time zone: UTC+3:30 (IRST)

Kuseh Kahriz (Persian: كوسه كهريز) (Note: Also romanized as Kūseh Kahrīz; also known as Kisa Kiagriz and Kūseh Kahrīzeh) is a village in Mokriyan-e Gharbi Rural District of the Central District in Mahabad County, West Azerbaijan province, Iran.

== Demographics ==
=== Population ===
At the time of the 2006 National Census, the village's population was 1,875 in 328 households. The following census in 2011 counted 2,023 people in 537 households. The 2016 census measured the population of the village as 1,940 people in 553 households.
