= Gabazeleh =

Village in West Azerbaijan province, Iran

Gabazeleh Persian: گابازله
- Village
- Location within Iran
- Coordinates: 36°56′08″N 45°47′37″E
- Country: Iran
- Province: West Azerbaijan
- County: Mahabad
- District: Central
- Rural District: Mokriyan-e Sharqi

Population (2016)
  - Total: 692
- Time zone: UTC+3:30 (IRST)

Gabazeleh (Persian: گابازله) (Note: Also romanized as Gābāzeleh and Gabāzeleh; also known as Kābāzaleh) is a village in Mokriyan-e Sharqi Rural District of the Central District in Mahabad County, West Azerbaijan province, Iran.

== Demographics ==
=== Population ===
At the time of the 2006 National Census, the village's population was 656 in 117 households. The following census in 2011 counted 699 people in 161 households. The 2016 census measured the population of the village as 692 people in 166 households.
