= Torshakan =

Village in West Azerbaijan province, Iran

Torshakan Persian: ترشكان
- Village
- Location within Iran
- Coordinates: 36°54′15″N 45°49′26″E
- Country: Iran
- Province: West Azerbaijan
- County: Mahabad
- District: Central
- Rural District: Mokriyan-e Sharqi

Population (2016)
  - Total: 579
- Time zone: UTC+3:30 (IRST)

Torshakan (Persian: ترشكان) (Note: Also romanized as Torshakān; also known as Torshkanān) is a village in Mokriyan-e Sharqi Rural District of the Central District in Mahabad County, West Azerbaijan province, Iran.

== Demographics ==
=== Population ===
At the time of the 2006 National Census, the village's population was 404 in 88 households. The following census in 2011 counted 498 people in 140 households. The 2016 census measured the population of the village as 579 people in 164 households.
