= Qezel Qapi =

Village in West Azerbaijan province, Iran

Qezel Qapi Persian: قزل قپي
- Village
- Location within Iran
- Coordinates: 36°55′55″N 45°43′24″E
- Country: Iran
- Province: West Azerbaijan
- County: Mahabad
- District: Central
- Rural District: Mokriyan-e Gharbi

Population (2016)
  - Total: 2,134
- Time zone: UTC+3:30 (IRST)

Qezel Qapi (Persian: قزل قپي) (Note: Also romanized as Qezel Qapī and Qezel Qopī; also known as Qezelqūpī) is a village in Mokriyan-e Gharbi Rural District of the Central District in Mahabad County, West Azerbaijan province, Iran.

== Demographics ==
=== Population ===
At the time of the 2006 National Census, the village's population was 1,935 in 395 households. The following census in 2011 counted 2,142 people in 410 households. The 2016 census measured the population of the village as 2,134 people in 518 households.
