= Qarah Bolagh, Mahabad =

Village in West Azerbaijan province, Iran

Qarah Bolagh Persian: قره بلاغ
- Village
- Location within Iran
- Coordinates: 36°45′39″N 45°50′17″E
- Country: Iran
- Province: West Azerbaijan
- County: Mahabad
- District: Central
- Rural District: Akhtachi-ye Gharbi

Population (2016)
  - Total: 204
- Time zone: UTC+3:30 (IRST)

Qarah Bolagh (Persian: قره بلاغ) (Note: Also romanized as Qarah Bolāgh and Qareh Bolāgh; also known as Qareh Bolāq) is a village in, and the capital of, Akhtachi-ye Gharbi Rural District in the Central District of Mahabad County, West Azerbaijan province, Iran.

== Demographics ==
=== Population ===
At the time of the 2006 National Census, the village's population was 245 in 39 households. The following census in 2011 counted 218 people in 47 households. The 2016 census measured the population of the village as 204 people in 57 households.
