= Kahrizeh-ye Sheykhan =

Village in West Azerbaijan province, Iran

Kahrizeh-ye Sheykhan Persian: كهريزه شيخان
- Village
- Location within Iran
- Coordinates: 36°48′44″N 45°41′33″E
- Country: Iran
- Province: West Azerbaijan
- County: Mahabad
- District: Central
- Rural District: Mokriyan-e Gharbi

Population (2016)
  - Total: 559
- Time zone: UTC+3:30 (IRST)

Kahrizeh-ye Sheykhan (Persian: كهريزه شيخان) (Note: Also romanized as Kahrīzeh-ye Sheykhān) is a village in Mokriyan-e Gharbi Rural District of the Central District in Mahabad County, West Azerbaijan province, Iran.

== Demographics ==
=== Population ===
At the time of the 2006 National Census, the village's population was 508 in 89 households. The following census in 2011 counted 610 people in 144 households. The 2016 census measured the population of the village as 559 people in 152 households.
