= Qarah Qeshlaq, Mahabad =

Village in West Azerbaijan province, Iran

Qarah Qeshlaq Persian: قره قشلاق
- Village
- Location within Iran
- Coordinates: 36°58′36″N 45°42′20″E
- Country: Iran
- Province: West Azerbaijan
- County: Mahabad
- District: Central
- Rural District: Mokriyan-e Gharbi

Population (2016)
  - Total: 1,503
- Time zone: UTC+3:30 (IRST)

Qarah Qeshlaq (Persian: قره قشلاق) (Note: Also romanized as Qarah Qeshlāq and Qareh Qeshlāq) is a village in Mokriyan-e Gharbi Rural District of the Central District in Mahabad County, West Azerbaijan province, Iran.

== Demographics ==
=== Population ===
At the time of the 2006 National Census, the village's population was 1,455 in 255 households. The following census in 2011 counted 1,482 people in 320 households. The 2016 census measured the population of the village as 1,503 people in 345 households.
