= Kelijeh, West Azerbaijan =

Village in West Azerbaijan province, Iran

Kelijeh Persian: كليجه
- Village
- Location within Iran
- Coordinates: 36°41′40″N 45°56′01″E
- Country: Iran
- Province: West Azerbaijan
- County: Mahabad
- District: Central
- Rural District: Akhtachi-ye Gharbi

Population (2016)
  - Total: 661
- Time zone: UTC+3:30 (IRST)

Kelijeh (Persian: كليجه) (Note: Also romanized as Kelījeh; also known as Golījeh) is a village in Akhtachi-ye Gharbi Rural District of the Central District in Mahabad County, West Azerbaijan province, Iran.

== Demographics ==
=== Population ===
At the time of the 2006 National Census, the village's population was 682 in 125 households. The following census in 2011 counted 766 people in 156 households. The 2016 census measured the population of the village as 661 people in 137 households.
