= Gerdeh Rash =

Gerdeh Rash (Persian: گرده رش) may refer to:

- Gerdeh Rash, Mahabad
- Gerdeh Rash, Miandoab
