= Gug Tappeh, Mahabad =

Village in West Azerbaijan province, Iran

Gug Tappeh Persian: گوگ تپه
- Village
- Location within Iran
- Coordinates: 36°52′11″N 45°48′17″E
- Country: Iran
- Province: West Azerbaijan
- County: Mahabad
- District: Central
- Rural District: Mokriyan-e Sharqi

Population (2016)
  - Total: 6,947
- Time zone: UTC+3:30 (IRST)

Gug Tappeh (Persian: گوگ تپه) (Note: Also romanized as Gowg Tappeh and Gūg Tappeh; also known as Gog Tappeh) is a village in, and the capital of, Mokriyan-e Sharqi Rural District in the Central District of Mahabad County, West Azerbaijan province, Iran.

== Demographics ==
=== Population ===
At the time of the 2006 National Census, the village's population was 4,377 in 877 households. The following census in 2011 counted 6,436 people in 1,608 households. The 2016 census measured the population of the village as 6,947 people in 1,886 households. It was the most populous village in its rural district.
