= Sanjaq, Iran =

Village in West Azerbaijan province, Iran

Sanjaq Persian: سنجاق
- Village
- Location within Iran
- Coordinates: 36°46′47″N 45°57′50″E
- Country: Iran
- Province: West Azerbaijan
- County: Mahabad
- District: Central
- Rural District: Akhtachi-ye Gharbi

Population (2016)
  - Total: 404
- Time zone: UTC+3:30 (IRST)

Sanjaq (Persian: سنجاق) (Note: Also romanized as Sanjāq) is a village in Akhtachi-ye Gharbi Rural District of the Central District in Mahabad County, West Azerbaijan province, Iran.

== Demographics ==
=== Population ===
At the time of the 2006 National Census, the village's population was 479 in 89 households. The following census in 2011 counted 479 people in 94 households. The 2016 census measured the population of the village as 404 people in 90 households.
