= The Hundred-word Eulogy =

Praise of Islam written by Chinese emperor

The Hundred-word Eulogy (Chinese: 百字讃; pinyin: Bǎi Zì Zàn) is a 100-character praise of Islam and the Islamic prophet Muhammad written by the Hongwu Emperor of the Chinese Ming dynasty in 1368. Copies of it are on display in several mosques in Nanjing, China. The eulogy signalled the beginning of a series of policies significant to the development of Islam in China.

== Context ==
After living as a monk to escape poverty, the Hongwu Emperor (born Zhu Yuanzhang) rose to power as a military leader within the Red Turban Rebellion. After unifying China in 1368, he founded the Ming Dynasty and restored Han Chinese rule. As the dynasty's first emperor, the Hongwu Emperor instituted several major social and administrative reforms, most of which were codified within the Great Ming Code. Among his many goals was redefining morality and order in Chinese society.

The Hongwu Emperor's reign was marked by an aggressive regulation of minority religions such as Buddhism and Taoism, but also relative tolerance towards Islam. It was recorded that "His Majesty ordered to have mosques built in Xijing and Nanjing (the capital cities), and in southern Yunnan, Fujian and Guangdong. His Majesty also personally wrote baizizan (eulogy) in praise of the Prophet's virtues."

The emperor's motivations for writing the 100 word eulogy, and the reasons for his broader tolerance of Islam, are not definitively known. Many prominent military commanders of the time, including Lan Yu, Mu Ying, Feng Sheng, Ding Dexing and Hu Dahai, are claimed to be Muslim by the Hui people, but these identifications are disputed by historians. Some even speculate that the emperor himself was Muslim, though there is no evidence to support this claim.

== Text ==
乾坤初始，天籍注名。
傳教大聖，降生西域。

授受天經，三十部冊，
普化眾生。 億兆君師，萬聖領袖。

協助天運， 保庇國民。
五時祈祐， 默祝太平。
存心真主， 加志窮民。
拯救患難， 洞徹幽冥。

超拔靈魂， 脱離罪業。
仁覆天下， 道冠古今。

降邪歸一， 教名清真。

穆罕默德，至貴聖人。

— Text and translation by B. Newlon
Translation:

The universe began with the heavenly tablet recording his name.
The religion-delivering great sage, born in the western realm.

Conferring and receiving heavenly scripture in thirty parts, universally transforming all created beings.
Master of the trillion rulers, leader of the ten thousand sages.

Assisted by destiny, protector of the community.
In each of the five prayers, he silently supplicates for their total well-being.
His heart directed towards Allah, remembering the needy.
Deliver them from tribulations to safety, Knower of the unseen.

Exalted above every soul and spirit, free from any blameworthy deeds.
A mercy to all of the worlds, whose path is preeminent for all time.

Renouncing spiritual ignorance; returning to The One — that is the religion called Islam.

Muhammad is the most noble sage.

== Legacy ==
The Hundred-Word Eulogy was composed during a period of concerted assimilation policies implemented by the imperial administration. Under the Hongwu Emperor, the use of some foreign languages and certain forms of dress were prohibited or strictly regulated. These policies disproportionately affected Hui and Uyghur Muslims, who often recited the Qur'an in Arabic and wore turbans for worship.

The Hongwu Emperor's combination of tolerance toward Islam and relative isolationism also contributed to the development of new Islamic and syncretic traditions in China. With customary pilgrimages restricted, Chinese Muslims consolidated existing literature and established institutions known as Scripture Halls, which became centers of Islamic education. These schools combined teachings from the Qur'an with Confucian styles of management and education. During his visit to China, famed Muslim explorer Ibn Battuta wrote that “…In every town there is a special quarter for the Muslims inhabited solely by them where they have their mosques; they are honored and respected by the Chinese.”

== See also ==
- Shangdi
- Islam in China
