= Bardeh Rashan, Mahabad =

Village in West Azerbaijan province, Iran

Bardeh Rashan Persian: برده رشان
- Village
- Location within Iran
- Coordinates: 36°54′20″N 45°54′22″E
- Country: Iran
- Province: West Azerbaijan
- County: Mahabad
- District: Central
- Rural District: Mokriyan-e Sharqi

Population (2016)
  - Total: 520
- Time zone: UTC+3:30 (IRST)

Bardeh Rashan (Persian: برده رشان) (Note: Also romanized as Bardeh Rashān) is a village in Mokriyan-e Sharqi Rural District of the Central District in Mahabad County, West Azerbaijan province, Iran.

== Demographics ==
=== Population ===
At the time of the 2006 National Census, the village's population was 579 in 102 households. The following census in 2011 counted 553 people in 150 households. The 2016 census measured the population of the village as 520 people in 131 households.
