= Yusef Kandi, Mahabad =

Village in West Azerbaijan province, Iran

Yusef Kandi Persian: يوسف كندي
- Village
- Location within Iran
- Coordinates: 36°49′09″N 45°44′09″E
- Country: Iran
- Province: West Azerbaijan
- County: Mahabad
- District: Central
- Rural District: Mokriyan-e Gharbi

Population (2016)
  - Total: 3,172
- Time zone: UTC+3:30 (IRST)

Yusef Kandi (Persian: يوسف كندي) (Note: Also romanized as Yūsef Kandī, Yūsefkandī, and Yūsof Kandī; also known as Yūsof Kand and Yusuf Kandi) is a village in Mokriyan-e Gharbi Rural District of the Central District in Mahabad County, West Azerbaijan province, Iran.

== Demographics ==
=== Population ===
At the time of the 2006 National Census, the village's population was 2,345 in 488 households. The following census in 2011 counted 2,882 people in 730 households. The 2016 census measured the population of the village as 3,172 people in 891 households.
