= Seyyedabad, Mahabad =

Neighborhood in West Azerbaijan province, Iran

Seyyedabad Persian: سيداباد
- Neighborhood
- Location within Iran
- Coordinates: 36°45′57″N 45°45′56″E
- Country: Iran
- Province: West Azerbaijan
- County: Mahabad
- District: Central
- City: Mahabad

Population (2016)
  - Total: 1,010
- Time zone: UTC+3:30 (IRST)

Seyyedabad (Persian: سيداباد) (Note: Also romanized as Seyyedābād; also known as Mazraeh (مزرعه), also romanized as Mazra‘eh) is a neighborhood in the city of Mahabad in the Central District of Mahabad County, West Azerbaijan province, Iran.

== Demographics ==
=== Population ===
At the time of the 2006 National Census, Seyyedabad's population was 138 in 38 households, when it was a village in Akhtachi-ye Gharbi Rural District. The following census in 2011 counted 68 people in 18 households. The 2016 census measured the population of the village as 1,010 people in 287 households. It was the most populous village in its rural district.

Seyyedabad was annexed by the city of Mahabad in 2021.
