= Ghiyath al-Din Naqqash =

15th-century Iranian diplomat to China

- Occupations: Chronicler, Painter, Envoy
- Writing career
- Language: Persian
- Notable work: Account of the Timurid Embassy to the Ming Court

Mawlānā Ghiyāth al-Dīn Naqqāsh (Persian: غیاث الدین نقاش; fl. 1419–22) was an envoy of the Timurid ruler of Persia and Transoxania, Mirza Shahrukh (r. 1404–1447), to the court of the Yongle Emperor (r. 1402–1424) of the Ming Dynasty of China, known for an important account he wrote of his embassy. His name has also been transcribed in English works as Ḡīāṯ-al-Dīn Naqqaš, Ghiyasu'd-Din Naqqash, Ghiyāthu'd-Dīn Naqqāsh, or Ghiyathuddin Naqqash.

Ghiyasu'd-Din Naqqash was the official diarist of the large embassy sent by Mirza Shahrukh, whose capital was in Herat, to the court of China's Yongle Emperor in 1419. According to Vasily Bartold, he was a painter, as the moniker "Naqqash" indicated.

Nothing is known of Ghiyasu'd-Din Naqqash beyond what he tells in his diary. Rosemarie Quiring-Zoche suggested in 1980 that he may have been the same person as Mawlānā Ghiyāthu'd-Dīn Simnānī known from other sources, but later authors have viewed this suggestion as not proven by any evidence.

== Shahrukh's embassy's travel to China ==
The embassy, which included envoys from Shahrukh himself (Shādī Khwāja and Kökchä) and from his son Bāysonḡor (Sultān Ahmad and Ghiyāth al-dīn Naqqāsh), left Shahrukh's capital Herat on November 24, 1419 (6 of Zu'lqáda 822 AH). From Herat the envoys went via Balkh to Samarqand. They expected to meet there with another group of envoys, sent by Shahrukh's viceroy of Transoxania, Ulugh Beg. However, it turned out that Ulugh Beg's delegation had left already, and Shahrukh's party had to proceed separately. They left Samarqand for China on February 25, 1420, along with Chinese envoys returning home.

The envoys traveled along a northern branch of the Silk Road, via Tashkent and Sayram. Naqqash's account notes the existence of large "infidel" communities in both Turpan and Kumul (Hami), both those that "worshipped the cross" and those adoring Shakyamuni.

The embassy entered China at the western end of the Great Wall at Jiayuguan on August 29, 1420. To comply with China's immigration regulations, a count of the travelers was taken at Suzhou, the first city after Jiayuguan (some 45 km after crossing the great wall). As it was commonly the case with Central Asian embassies to China, a large number of merchants had joined the emirs' envoys, the overall size of the traveling party reaching about 500 men.

From Suzhou, the embassy was transported on to Beijing by the Chinese courier service (yichuan), over the 99 courier stations along the 2900-km route. The embassy travelled via Ganzhou, Lanzhou (where they were impressed by the pontoon bridge over which they crossed the Yellow River), Xi'an (although the [extant part of] the diary does not cover this city), another Yellow River crossing at Tong Pass (November 18), the capital of North Zhili Zhengding (December 3), and reached Beijing on December 14.

The Persians spent 5 months at the court of the Yongle Emperor. According to Naqqash, their main handler at the Yongle Emperor court was one Mawlānā Hājjī Yūsuf Qāzī, who occupied an important office in the emperor's government, and knew Arabic, Mongolian, Persian, and Chinese languages.

Naqqash's account contains a detailed description of the court ceremonies (in particular, the early-morning audiences), the banquets combined with musical and artistic performances (he was especially impressed by Chinese acrobats), and the administration of justice (he got to witness death by a thousand cuts).

On May 18, 1421, the envoys left Beijing for their trip home. With several months' delays in Ganzhou and Xiaozhou due to Mongol incursions, they only were able to leave China, via the same Jiayuguan checkpoint, on January 13, 1422. The names of all members of the party were checked by the border authorities against the register which recorded their original entry into the country, and once everything matched, they were allowed to leave.

The Herat envoys returned to their hometown on August 29, 1422 (11 of Ramazan 825 AH).

Ghiyasu'd-Din Naqqash kept a diary of his travels throughout China, where he wrote about China's wealthy economy and huge urban markets, its efficient courier system as compared to that in Persia, the hospitality of his hosts at the courier stations in providing comfortable lodging and food, and the fine luxurious goods and craftsmanship of the Chinese.

== Transmission and publications of Ghiyāthu'd-Dīn's diary ==
=== Persian versions ===
Ghiyasu'd-Din's account of the Timurid mission to Beijing is considered one of the most important and popular Muslim works on China, and provides modern historians with important information on the transportation and foreign relations of the early-Ming China. The original text of Ghiyasu'd-Din's diary has not survived to our days. However, soon after its creation, it (or large excerpts from it) became incorporated into numerous texts widely copied throughout the Iranian- and Turkic-speaking parts of the Middle East.

The earliest known work containing Ghiyāthu'd-Dīn's account is the Persian chronicle (whose name is variously transcribed as Zobdat al-tawāriḵ-e Bāysonḡori or Zubdatu-t-tawārīḫ-i Bāysunġurī) (زبده التواریخ بایسنقری), compiled by Shah Rukh's court historian Hafiz-i Abru (died 1430).

More familiar to the later Persian-language readers was another version of Ghiyāthu'd-Dīn's report, found in the work called Matla-us-Sadain wa Majma-ul-Bahrain (مطلع السعدين ومجمع البحرين) (The Rise of the Two auspicious constellations and the Confluence of the Two Oceans), compiled by Abd-ur-Razzaq Samarqandi, who, like Ghiyāthu'd-Dīn, also travelled abroad as an envoy of Shah Rukh (in his case, to India).

=== Turkic translations ===
By the late 15th century Turkic translations of Ghiyāthu'd-Dīn account appear as well. One such translation, bearing a rather misleading title Tārīkh-i Khaṭā'ī ("History of Cathay"), has survived to our day in Cambridge University Library. It is a copy of the translation made in AH 900 (AD 1494/1495) in Ardistān by Hājjī bin Muhammad, for the city's Turkic-speaking governor who did not speak Persian. The document is considered unique by modern researchers in that it is the only known Turkic translation of Ghiyāthu'd-Dīn's work prepared outside of the Ottoman Empire. According to modern linguists, the idiom used by the translator, which Ildikó Bellér-Hann calls "Türk ʿAcämī", can be described as "the historical predecessor of what is today called the Azerbaijani Turkic language".

Throughout 16th through 18th centuries, Ghiyāthu'd-Dīn's work became incorporated into various Turkish compilative works published in the Ottoman Empire. Notably, it served as one of the three main sources for the information on China in Katip Çelebi's Jihān-numā, along with Khataynameh (a later (1516) account by the merchant 'Ali Akbar Khata'i) and a European source.

=== Western translations ===
An English translation of Hafiz-i Abru's text by K.M. (Kishori Mohan) Maitra, along with the Persian original, was published in Lahore in 1934 as "A Persian Embassy to China: Being an extract from Zubdatu't Ol Tawarikh of Hafiz Abrut". In the late 1960s, L. Carrington Goodrich of Columbia University realized that K.M. Maitra's translation was very much out of print, and practically unobtainable, as a result of Maitra's displacement due to the 1947 Partition of India. In order to have this work "rescued from oblivion", he had a microfilm of the British Museum's copy of the book sent to him, and had it reprinted in New York in 1970 with his own introduction.

Wheeler Thackston published his English translation of Naqqash's account in 1989. A critical edition, it made use of several known versions of the story.

A transcription of Hājjī bin Muhammad's "Türk ʿAcämī" (proto-Azerbaijani) translation into Romanized orthography, and an English translation, have been published in 2005 in the US by Ildikó Bellér-Hann.

A Russian translation of Ghiyasu'd-Din Naqqash's diary (as per Hafiz Abru) was published in Kazakhstan in 2009.

== See also ==
- Chen Cheng (Ming Dynasty), the Yongle Emperor's envoy to Shah Rukh's court
- Ma Huan and Fei Xin, chronists of Zheng He's Chinese fleet that reached Persia's Ormuz at the same time period
- Bento de Góis, a Portuguese Jesuit who traveled with caravans along a similar route 180 years later
