= Qarah Dagh, Mahabad =

Village in West Azerbaijan province, Iran

Qarah Dagh Persian: قره داغ
- Village
- Location within Iran
- Coordinates: 36°57′29″N 45°45′48″E
- Country: Iran
- Province: West Azerbaijan
- County: Mahabad
- District: Central
- Rural District: Mokriyan-e Sharqi

Population (2016)
  - Total: 1,004
- Time zone: UTC+3:30 (IRST)

Qarah Dagh (Persian: قره داغ) (Note: Also romanized as Qarah Dāgh and Qareh Dāgh) is a village in Mokriyan-e Sharqi Rural District of the Central District in Mahabad County, West Azerbaijan province, Iran.

== Demographics ==
=== Population ===
At the time of the 2006 National Census, the village's population was 887 in 163 households. The following census in 2011 counted 961 people in 260 households. The 2016 census measured the population of the village as 1,004 people in 211 households.
