= Isa Kand =

Village in West Azerbaijan province, Iran

Isa Kand Persian: عيسي كند
- Village
- Location within Iran
- Coordinates: 36°39′37″N 45°59′27″E
- Country: Iran
- Province: West Azerbaijan
- County: Mahabad
- District: Central
- Rural District: Akhtachi-ye Gharbi

Population (2016)
  - Total: 310
- Time zone: UTC+3:30 (IRST)

Isa Kand (Persian: عيسي كند) (Note: Also romanized as ‘Īsá Kand; also known as ‘Īsá Kandī) is a village in Akhtachi-ye Gharbi Rural District of the Central District in Mahabad County, West Azerbaijan province, Iran.

== Demographics ==
=== Population ===
At the time of the 2006 National Census, the village's population was 389 in 63 households. The following census in 2011 counted 337 people in 66 households. The 2016 census measured the population of the village as 310 people in 71 households.
