= Khvor Khvoreh, Mahabad =

Village in West Azerbaijan province, Iran

Khvor Khvoreh Persian: خورخوره
- Village
- Location within Iran
- Coordinates: 36°59′17″N 45°43′12″E
- Country: Iran
- Province: West Azerbaijan
- County: Mahabad
- District: Central
- Rural District: Mokriyan-e Gharbi

Population (2016)
  - Total: 1,354
- Time zone: UTC+3:30 (IRST)

Khvor Khvoreh (Persian: خورخوره) (Note: Also romanized as Khowr Khowreh; also known as Khor Khoreh and Khorkhora) is a village in Mokriyan-e Gharbi Rural District of the Central District in Mahabad County, West Azerbaijan province, Iran.

== Demographics ==
=== Population ===
At the time of the 2006 National Census, the village's population was 1,270 in 222 households. The following census in 2011 counted 1,399 people in 307 households. The 2016 census measured the population of the village as 1,354 people in 343 households.
