= Dareh Lak =

Village in West Azerbaijan province, Iran

Dareh Lak Persian: داره لك
- Village
- Location within Iran
- Coordinates: 36°54′23″N 45°44′54″E
- Country: Iran
- Province: West Azerbaijan
- County: Mahabad
- District: Central
- Rural District: Mokriyan-e Gharbi

Population (2016)
  - Total: 1,493
- Time zone: UTC+3:30 (IRST)

Dareh Lak (Persian: داره لك) (Note: Also romanized as Dāreh Lak and Darreh Lak; also known as Dārlak; in Armenian: Դարալաք) is a village in Mokriyan-e Gharbi Rural District of the Central District in Mahabad County, West Azerbaijan province, Iran.

== Demographics ==
=== Population ===
At the time of the 2006 National Census, the village's population was 1,454 in 262 households. The following census in 2011 counted 1,501 people in 337 households. The 2016 census measured the population of the village as 1,493 people in 358 households.
