= Ozun Darreh, Fars =

Ozun Darreh ازن دره
- Village
- Location within Iran
- Coordinates: 29°52′00″N 52°43′42″E
- Country: Iran
- Province: Fars
- County: Marvdasht
- Bakhsh: Central
- Rural District: Majdabad

Population (2006)
  - Total: 210
- Time zone: UTC+3:30 (IRST)
  - Summer (DST): UTC+4:30 (IRDT)

Ozun Darreh (Persian: ازن دره, also Romanized as Ozūn Darreh; also known as Owzown Darreh and Ūzūn Darreh) is a village in Majdabad Rural District, in the Central District of Marvdasht County, Fars province, Iran. At the 2006 census, its population was 210, in 50 families.
