= Qarah Dagh, Bukan =

Qarah Dagh قره داغ
- Village
- Location within Iran
- Coordinates: 36°27′14″N 45°55′27″E
- Country: Iran
- Province: West Azerbaijan
- County: Bukan
- Bakhsh: Central
- Rural District: Il Teymur

Population (2006)
  - Total: 154
- Time zone: UTC+3:30 (IRST)
  - Summer (DST): UTC+4:30 (IRDT)

Qarah Dagh (Persian: قره داغ, also Romanized as Qarah Dāgh) is a village in Il Teymur Rural District, in the Central District of Bukan County, West Azerbaijan Province, Iran. At the 2006 census, its population was 154, in 22 families.
