= Chen You =

Chen You (Xiao'erjing: چٌ ﻳَﻮْ) was a Muslim Hui general of the Ming dynasty.

== Philanthropy ==
In 1447, the Muslim Hui general Chen You financed the restoration of the Dong Si Mosque ('Propagation of Brightness Mosque').
