= Xətai, Nakhchivan =

Xətai
- Municipality
- Location within Azerbaijan
- Coordinates: 39°31′20″N 45°03′48″E
- Country: Azerbaijan
- Autonomous republic: Nakhchivan
- District: Sharur

Population (2005)
  - Total: 376
- Time zone: UTC+4 (AZT)

Xətai (also, Khatai and Khetai) is a municipality and village in the Sharur District of Nakhchivan, Azerbaijan. It is located 14 km away from the district center, on the plain. Its population is busy with farming and animal husbandry. There are secondary school, library and a medical center in the village. It has a population of 376.

== Etymology ==
In the 1930s, the settlement was established near the residence of sovkhoz (soviet farm) and named as Sovxoz (Sovkhoz) in the name of the 10th anniversary of Nakhchivan ASSR. In 1991, it was named as Xətai (Khatai) in honor of the greatest Azerbaijani poet and statesman, Shah Ismail Khatai. It is a memorial toponym.
