= Hu Dahai =

Chinese general (died 1362)

- 胡大海
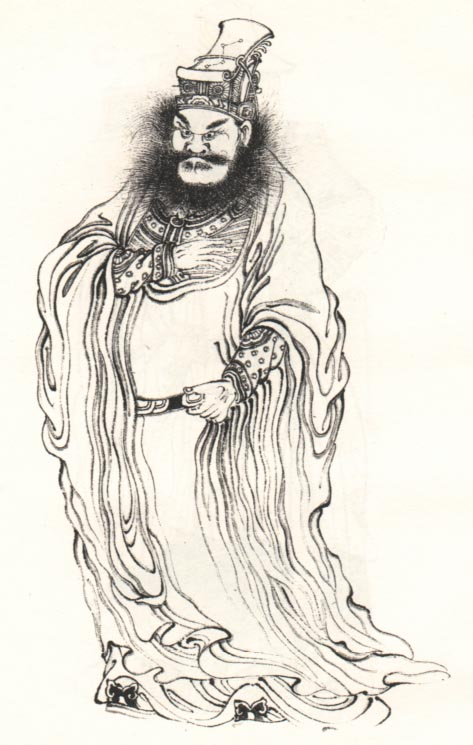
- Depiction of Hu Dahai
- Born: Si County, Anhui
- Died: 1362; Yanzhou
- Other name: Tongfu (通甫)
- Occupation: military general

Hu Dahai (Chinese: 胡大海; pinyin: Hú Dàhǎi; died 1362), courtesy name Tongfu (通甫), was a Chinese Hui and military general who lived in the 14th century. He is best known for helping Zhu Yuanzhang (the Hongwu Emperor) establish the Ming dynasty in China.

== Life ==
Hu Dahai was born in present-day Si County, Anhui Province. Hu joined Zhu Yuanzhang's army sometime around the fall of the Mongol-led Yuan dynasty. After Zhu's forces crossed the Yangtze River, they captured all of southern Anhui, most of Zhejiang, and other surrounding areas. Hu received positions of leadership and led troops which defeated rival warlord Yang Wanzhe, leading other Miao chieftains Jiang Ying, Liu Zhen, and Li Fu to surrender. He served as administrator of the entire Jiangnan region, and was responsible for safeguarding the Jinhua area of Zhejiang.

Although Hu was illiterate, he was renowned for his humility and willingness to accept suggestions from his subordinates. He recommended several well-known scholars and officials from Zhejiang to the service of Zhu Yuanzhang (who later established the Ming dynasty and became its first emperor), including Liu Bowen, Song Lian, Ye Chen, and Zhang Yi. Hu's troops were highly disciplined, and Hu once described them, "My fighting men do not know writing, they only know three duties: do not kill, do not violate women and girls, and do not burn down huts or farmhouses."

In early 1362, Miao chieftains Jiang Ying, Liu Zhen, and Li Fu came to appear before Hu in Yanzhou (now part of Jinhua and Hangzhou, not to be confused with Yanzhou in Shandong) and offered their surrender and allegiance. Hu lauded the men for their courage and made them honorary officers under his command. However, the three chieftains had no intentions of ever serving Hu. Soon after their surrender, Jiang Ying invited Hu to perform a review of some crossbowmen at the Bayong Tower in Jinhua. As Hu prepared to mount his horse and leave the review, a Miao soldier came running up and fell on his knees in front of Hu's horse, and declared that Jiang Ying was trying to kill him. Hu turned and looked at Jiang Ying, who withdrew a wooden club he had hidden in his sleeve and attacked Hu, bashing his skull and killing him. At the same time, other Miao men attacked and killed Hu's son, Hu Guanzhu, as well as Geng Zaicheng. The Miao men looted the city and fled back into their mountain homes.
