= Khataynama =

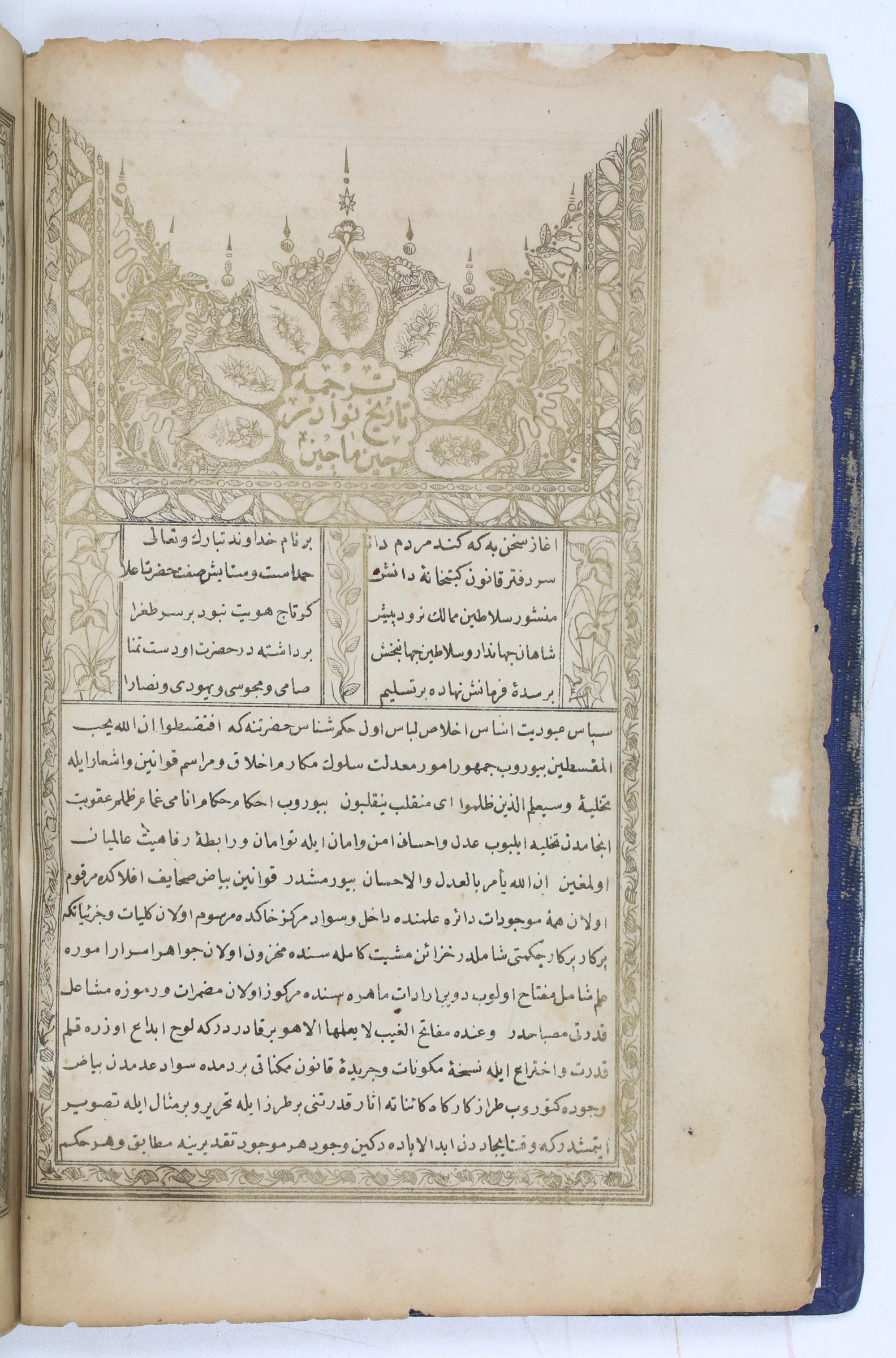
Ottoman Turkish translation of the Khataynama's Persian original. Manuscript entitled: Tercüme-i târih-i nevâdir-i Çin Mâçîn ("Translation of the rare history and descriptions of China"). Created at the Tophâne-i Âmire Litografya Destigâhi, dated 1854

Khataynama (Persian: خطای‌نامه, romanized: Book on China) is a Persian-language travelogue about Ming China, composed in Constantinople in the early 16th century by 'Ali Akbar Khata'i.

This travelogue demonstrates awareness of Iran as a religious, cultural, and geopolitical notion. The introduction of the Khataynama states that a different Muslim realms (mamlekat-e Mosalmani) existed: Arabestan (the land of Arabs), Rum (the land of Ottomans), and Ajamestan (the land of ajams), which is made up of realm of molk-e Iran (Iran) and Turan (Central Asia).

== Sources ==
- Amjadi, Maryam Ala (2021). "'The World is an Oyster and Iran, the Pearl': Representations of Iran in Safavid Persian Travel Literature". In Melville, Charles (ed.). Safavid Persia in the Age of Empires: The Idea of Iran. Vol. 10. I.B. Tauris. pp. 291–308.
- Kauz, Ralph (2000). "Ḵeṭāy-nāma". In Yarshater, Ehsan (ed.). Encyclopædia Iranica (Online ed.). Encyclopædia Iranica Foundation. ISBN 978-1934283295.
