= Ding Dexing =

Ding Dexing (simplified Chinese: 丁德兴; traditional Chinese: 丁德興; 1327–1367) was a Chinese general of the Ming dynasty in service of the Hongwu Emperor. He was a native of Dingyuan, Anhui.

Hui Chinese generally claim that Ding Dexing was a Hui.
