= 'Ali Akbar Khata'i =

16th century Persian traveler and writer

ʿAli Akbar Khata'i (modern Turkish: Ali Ekber Hıtai; fl. ca. 1500–1516) was an early 16th-century Persian traveler and writer. Although there is no certainty about his origin, it is known that by 1515 he came to (or returned to) Istanbul, where he published Khataynameh, which is considered one of the most complete travel notes about Ming China. His work, originally written in Persian, was later translated into Turkish, and became influential in the Turkish- and Persian-speaking Muslim world.

As with other Middle Eastern personages, there are a great number of ways to transcribe 'Ali Akbar's name. For example, Encyclopædia Iranica uses the spelling ʿAlī Akbar Ḵeṭāʾī.

== Life ==
Nothing much is known for sure about 'Ali Akbar's origin and early life. While he created his book in Istanbul, he may have been born elsewhere in the Islamic World - perhaps, as Aly Mazahéri suggested, based on textual references, even as far as in Transoxania (Bukhara).

Some researchers think that ʿAlī Akbar's name may indicate his Shi'ite origin. However, his text praises the Four Righteous Caliphs (venerated by the Sunnis), so even if born and raised a Shi'ite, he must have changed his religious affiliation due to the changing political situation.

ʿAlī Akbar is thought to have been a merchant by some authors. He refers to himself as a qalandar (dervish) a few times in his book; however, this may be just a figurative expression, emphasizing his humbleness, rather than a literal description of a membership in a dervish order.

The epithet "Khata'i" in ʿAli Akbar's name means "of China", presumably referring to him having traveled to and lived in China. While it is usually thought that at least some of the material in Khataynameh is based on the author's first hand experiences in China, at least one scholar of Khataynameh - Lin Yih-Min, who translated the book into modern Turkish - believes that ʿAlī Akbar (much like Juan González de Mendoza and perhaps Marco Polo) did not actually travel to China, and his work is thus completely based on others' reports.

== Khataynameh ==
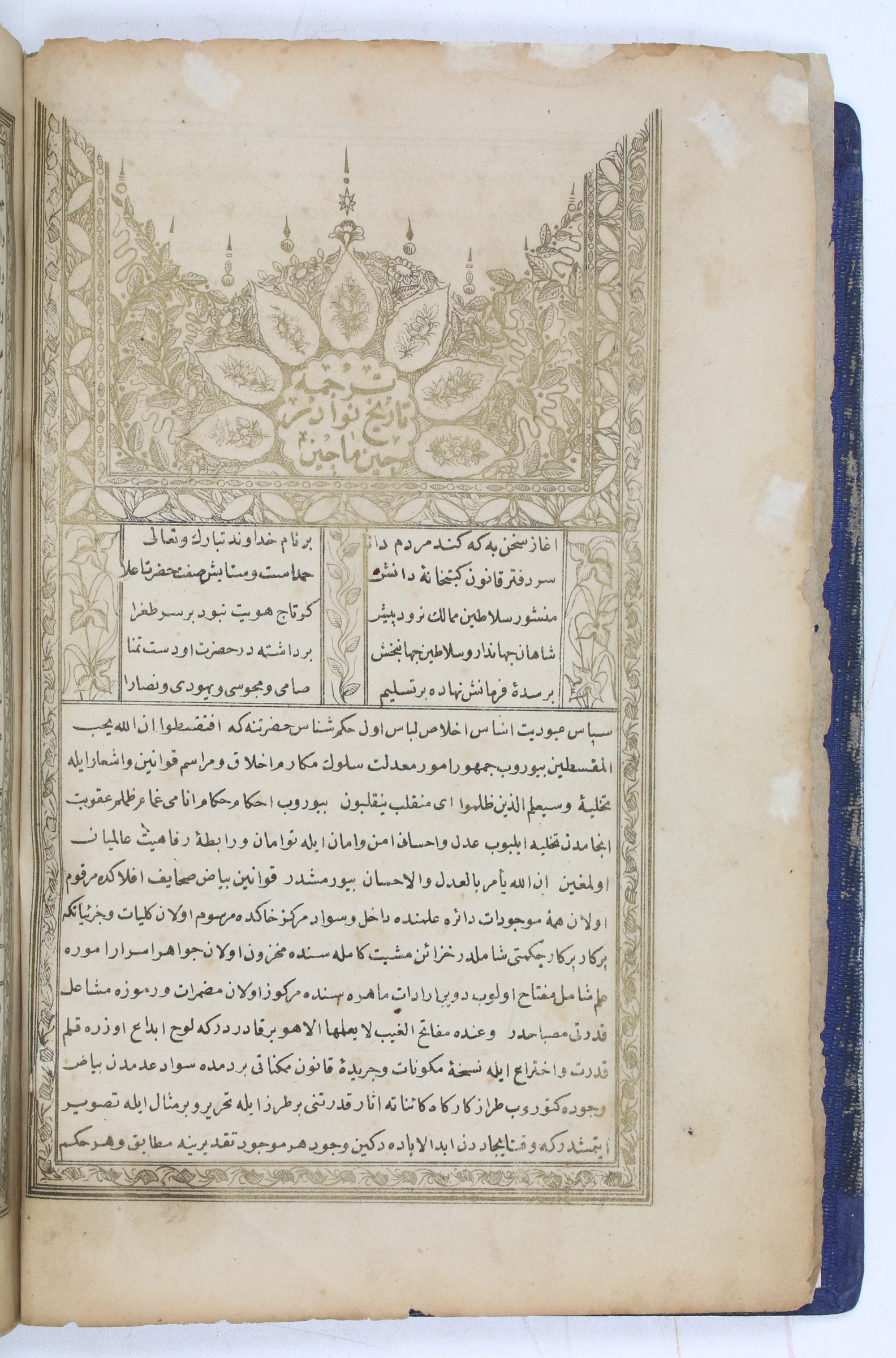
Ottoman Turkish translation of Khata'i's Persian original. Manuscript entitled: Tercüme-i târih-i nevâdir-i Çin Mâçîn ("Translation of the rare history and descriptions of China"). Created at the Tophâne-i Âmire Litografya Destigâhi, dated 1854

ʿAlī Akbar's Khataynameh ("The Book of China"), written in Persian, was completed in 1516 in Istanbul, and was made available in 1520.

ʿAlī Akbar's work, also known as Kanun-name, was translated into Ottoman Turkish in 1582. His work was used by later Turkish authors; in particular, it was one of the main sources of information on China used by Katip Çelebi in his Jihān-numā, along with an earlier work by a Ghiyāth al-dīn Naqqāsh. As modern researchers note, Ghiyāth al-dīn's and 'Ali Akbar's accounts, in a way, complemented each other, as the two authors saw Ming China from different aspects: Ghiyāth al-dīn came to the court of the Ming Yongle Emperor as a member of an official delegation from the Timurid ruler Shah Rukh, and much of his report is focused on court and diplomatic events; on the other hand, 'Ali Akbar, who, as Ildikó Bellér-Hann surmises, may have been a merchant, gives a much better view of the country's everyday life. Ali Akbar, in his book The Khataynameh, recorded many policies of the Ming court during Hongzhi and Zhengde reigns.

== Modern study and translations ==
Three chapters of the Khataynameh were translated into French by Charles Schefer and published in 1883, along with the Persian original.

== Sources ==
- Schefer, Charles (1883), "Trois chapitres du Khitay Namèh. Texte persan et traduction française", Mélanges orientaux: textes et traductions publiés par les professeurs de l'École spéciale des langues orientales vivantes à l'occasion du sixième Congrès international des orientalistes réuni à Leyde, Septembre 1883, Volume 9 of Publications de l'École des langues orientales vivantes, E. Laroux, pp. 29–84
- Bellér-Hann, Ildikó (1995), A History of Cathay: a translation and linguistic analysis of a fifteenth-century Turkic manuscript, Bloomington: Indiana University, Research Institute for Inner Asian Studies, ISBN 0-933070-37-3
- Chen, Yuan Julian (2021). Between the Islamic and Chinese Universal Empires: The Ottoman Empire, Ming Dynasty, and Global Age of Explorations, Journal of Early Modern History, 25(5), 422–456. doi: https://doi.org/10.1163/15700658-bja10030
