= Mokriyan-e Sharqi Rural District =

Rural district in West Azerbaijan province, Iran

Mokriyan-e Sharqi Rural District Persian: دهستان مكريان شرقي
- Rural District
- Location within Iran
- Coordinates: 36°54′N 45°55′E
- Country: Iran
- Province: West Azerbaijan
- County: Mahabad
- District: Central
- Established: 1987
- Capital: Gug Tappeh

Population (2016)
  - Total: 15,545
- Time zone: UTC+3:30 (IRST)

Mokriyan-e Sharqi Rural District (Persian: دهستان مكريان شرقي) is in the Central District of Mahabad County, West Azerbaijan province, Iran. Its capital is the village of Gug Tappeh.

== Demographics ==
=== Population ===
At the time of the 2006 National Census, the rural district's population was 12,831 in 2,418 households. There were 15,157 inhabitants in 3,823 households at the following census of 2011. The 2016 census measured the population of the rural district as 15,545 in 4,011 households. The most populous of its 23 villages was Gug Tappeh, with 6,947 people.

=== Other villages in the rural district ===
- Bardeh Rashan
- Gabazeleh
- Hajji Khvosh
- Kichabad
- Laj
- Qapi-ye Baba Ali
- Qarah Dagh
- Torshakan
