= Mokriyan-e Gharbi Rural District =

Rural district in West Azerbaijan province, Iran

Mokriyan-e Gharbi Rural District Persian: دهستان مكريان غربي
- Rural District
- Location within Iran
- Coordinates: 36°52′N 45°40′E
- Country: Iran
- Province: West Azerbaijan
- County: Mahabad
- District: Central
- Established: 1987
- Capital: Deryaz

Population (2016)
  - Total: 30,719
- Time zone: UTC+3:30 (IRST)

Mokriyan-e Gharbi Rural District (Persian: دهستان مكريان غربي) is in the Central District of Mahabad County, West Azerbaijan province, Iran. Its capital is the village of Deryaz.

== Demographics ==
=== Population ===
At the time of the 2006 National Census, the rural district's population was 25,643 in 4,882 households. There were 28,877 inhabitants in 6,772 households at the following census of 2011. The 2016 census measured the population of the rural district as 30,719 in 8,068 households. The most populous of its 38 villages was Khaneqah-e Khangeh (now a neighborhood in the city of Mahabad), with 4,736 people.

=== Other villages in the rural district ===
- Dareh Lak
- Deh Bekr
- Egriqash
- Kahrizeh-ye Sheykhan
- Khvor Khvoreh
- Kuseh Kahriz
- Qarah Khan
- Qarah Qeshlaq
- Qezel Qapi
- Qomqaleh
- Yusef Kandi
