= Akhtachi-ye Gharbi Rural District =

Rural district in West Azerbaijan province, Iran

Akhtachi-ye Gharbi Rural District Persian: دهستان آختاچی غربی
- Rural District
- Location within Iran
- Coordinates: 36°44′N 45°53′E
- Country: Iran
- Province: West Azerbaijan
- County: Mahabad
- District: Central
- Established: 1987
- Capital: Qarah Bolagh

Population (2016)
  - Total: 7,412
- Time zone: UTC+3:30 (IRST)

Akhtachi-ye Gharbi Rural District (Persian: دهستان آختاچی غربی) is in the Central District of Mahabad County, West Azerbaijan province, Iran. Its capital is the village of Qarah Bolagh.

== Demographics ==
=== Population ===
At the time of the 2006 National Census, the rural district's population was 7,899 in 1,452 households. There were 7,455 inhabitants in 1,519 households at the following census of 2011. The 2016 census measured the population of the rural district as 7,412 in 1,842 households. The most populous of its 40 villages was Seyyedabad (now a neighborhood in the city of Mahabad), with 1,010 people.

=== Other villages in the rural district ===
- Hajji Ali Kand
- Isa Kand
- Kelijeh
- Khatunbagh
- Sanjaq
- Utmish
