= Central District (Mahabad County) =

District in West Azerbaijan province, Iran

Central District (Mahabad County) Persian: بخش مرکزی شهرستان مهاباد
- District
- Location within Iran
- Coordinates: 36°51′N 45°48′E
- Country: Iran
- Province: West Azerbaijan
- County: Mahabad
- Capital: Mahabad

Population (2016)
  - Total: 222,069
- Time zone: UTC+3:30 (IRST)

The Central District of Mahabad County (Persian: بخش مرکزی شهرستان مهاباد) is in West Azerbaijan province, Iran. Its capital is the city of Mahabad.

== Demographics ==
=== Population ===
At the time of the 2006 National Census, the district's population was 179,697 in 39,752 households. The following census in 2011 counted 198,757 people in 50,507 households. The 2016 census measured the population of the district as 222,069 inhabitants in 61,895 households.

=== Administrative divisions ===
Central District (Mahabad County) Population
Administrative Divisions	2006	2011	2016
Akhtachi-ye Gharbi RD	7,899	7,455	7,412
Mokriyan-e Gharbi RD	25,643	28,877	30,719
Mokriyan-e Sharqi RD	12,831	15,157	15,545
Mahabad (city)	133,324	147,268	168,393
Total	179,697	198,757	222,069
RD = Rural District
