= Muslim Quarter =

Muslim Quarter may refer to:

- Muslim Quarter (Jerusalem)
- Xi'an Muslim Quarter
