= Klang Chinese Muslim Jamek Mosque =

Mosque in Klang, Selangor, Malaysia

- Malay: Masjid Jamek Cina Muslim Klang
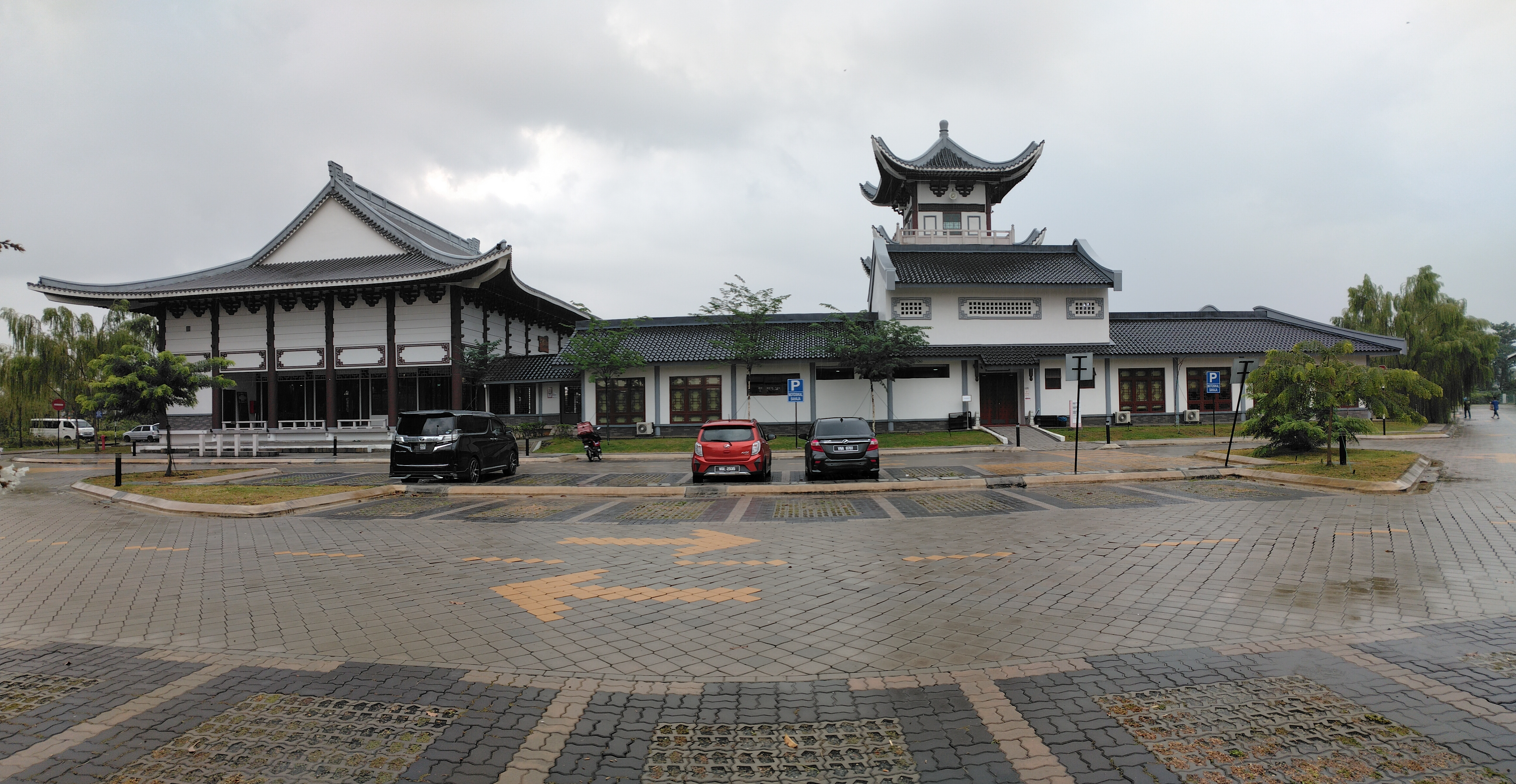

General information
- Type: Mosque
- Architectural style: Chinese architecture
- Location: Bandar Botanik, Klang, Malaysia
- Coordinates: 2.999946°N 101.444240°E
- Completed: 2024
- Opening: 22 August 2024
- Cost: RM19.3 million

The Klang Chinese Muslim Jamek Mosque (Malay: Masjid Jamek Cina Muslim Klang) is a mosque and cultural landmark located in Taman Desawan Dua, Bandar Botanik, Klang, Selangor, Malaysia. The mosque was officially opened to the public on 22 August 2024. It is the first mosque in the state of Selangor to feature traditional Chinese architecture and serves as a symbol of cultural and religious harmony in Malaysia.

== Architecture ==
The mosque's design draws inspiration from the architecture of the Great Mosque of Xi'an located in China, which is one of the oldest and largest mosques in the world. The mosque features prominent Chinese architectural elements, such as curved traditional Chinese roof structures and a three-story pagoda-shaped minaret. The mihrab area in the main prayer hall is decorated with Chinese calligraphy indicating the direction of Mecca. The unique architecture of the mosque is also complemented by a garden-concept landscape and a koi pond.

== Facilities ==
Built on a 1.2-hectare site, the mosque can accommodate up to 1,000 worshippers at a time. In addition to the main prayer hall, other facilities provided in the mosque complex include a cultural center, library, lecture room, souvenir shop, and food court. To accommodate visitors and the community, the mosque also provides copies of the Quran equipped with Mandarin translations.

== History and construction cost ==
The development of the Klang Chinese Muslim Jamek Mosque received the royal consent of His Royal Highness the Sultan of Selangor, Sultan Sharafuddin Idris Shah. The construction cost of the mosque was approximately RM19.3 million and was fully funded through allocations from the Selangor State Government, the Malaysian Chinese Muslim Association (MACMA), as well as public donations.

The manager of this mosque is Ahmad Mujahid Muhammad Zan, while the official imam position is held by Adlu Kan Yong Sheng.

== Purpose ==
The construction of this mosque contributes significantly to the Islamic tourism sector in Selangor by attracting both local and foreign visitors. It was also built to counter negative perceptions from certain parties and to convey a clear message that embracing Islam does not mean one has to discard their identity or forget their original cultural heritage.
