= Noor Deen Mi Guangjiang =

- Traditional Chinese: 米廣江
- Simplified Chinese: 米广江
Transcriptions
Standard Mandarin
- Hanyu Pinyin: Mǐ Guǎngjiāng
- Wade–Giles: Mi Kuang-chiang
other Mandarin
- Xiao'erjing: مِ قُوْاكِيْا

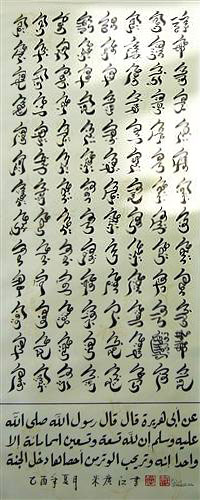
99 Names of God by Haji Noor Deen

Haji Noor Deen Mi Guangjiang (born 1963) is an expert in Islamic calligraphy, specializing in the Sini style which originated from the Chinese Muslim tradition.

Born in the province of Shandong, he is a lecturer at the Islamic College at Zhengzhou in the province of Henan, and is also a researcher of Islamic culture at the Henan Academy of Sciences. In 1997, Noor Deen was the first Chinese Muslim to be awarded the Egyptian Certificate of Arabic Calligraphy and to be admitted as a member of the Association of Egyptian Calligraphy. His calligraphy is known for its beauty and complexity.
