= Xi'an Muslim Quarter =

Street in Xi'an, China

Coordinates: 34°15′51″N 108°56′20″E

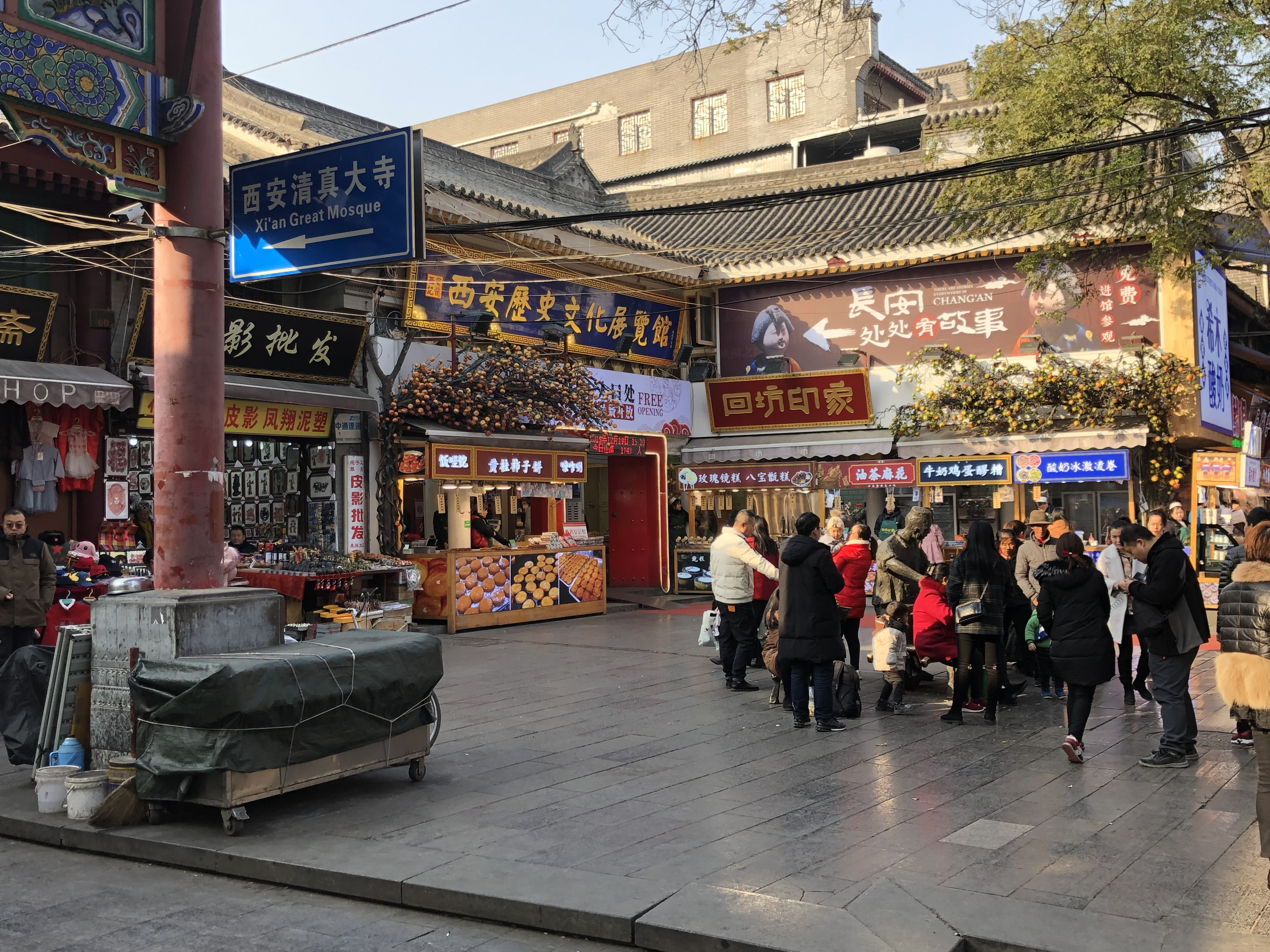
Xi'an Muslim Quarter

The Xi'an Muslim Quarter (Chinese: 西安回民街) is a snack and commercial street situated in the center part of Xi'an, China. It is close to the Bell Tower and the Drum Tower. Shehui Road is to the east, Zaoci Lane to the west, West Avenue to the south, and Hongfu Street to the north. There are ten mosques in the area. The biggest one is the Great Mosque, which was listed as the state-level protected heritage for its traditional buildings and religious significance. According to demographic statistics in 2010, about 60,000 people live in this area, more than half of which are the Huis and the others are the majority Hans. In the past few decades, Xi'an Muslim Quarter has become a well-known tourism site which is famous for its culture and food. It attracts visitors from all over the world each year.

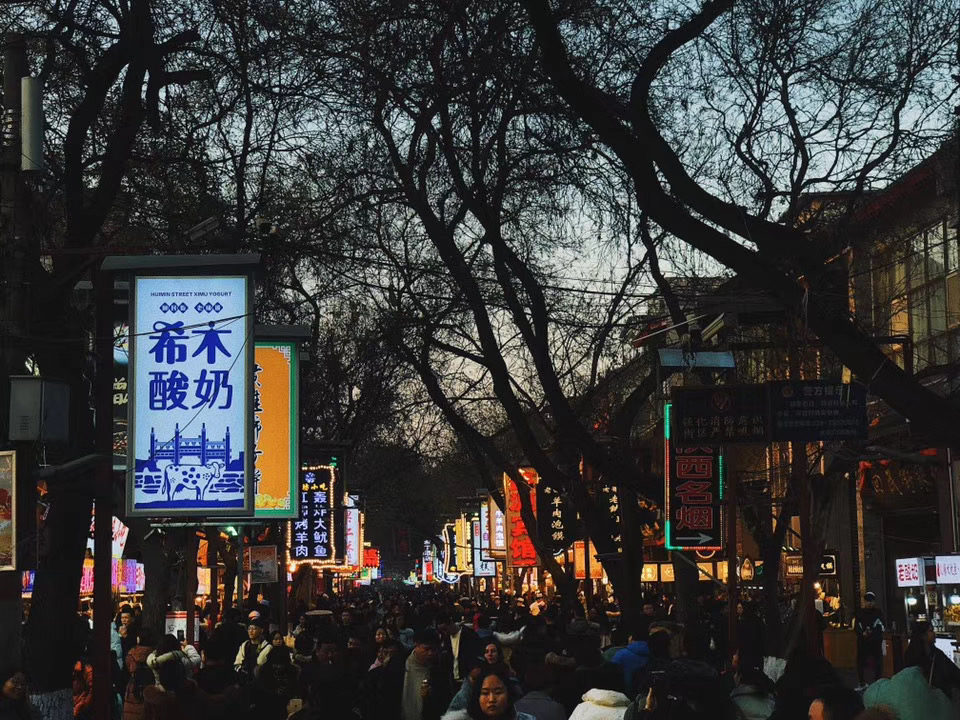
South entrance of the Xi'an Muslim Street

== History ==
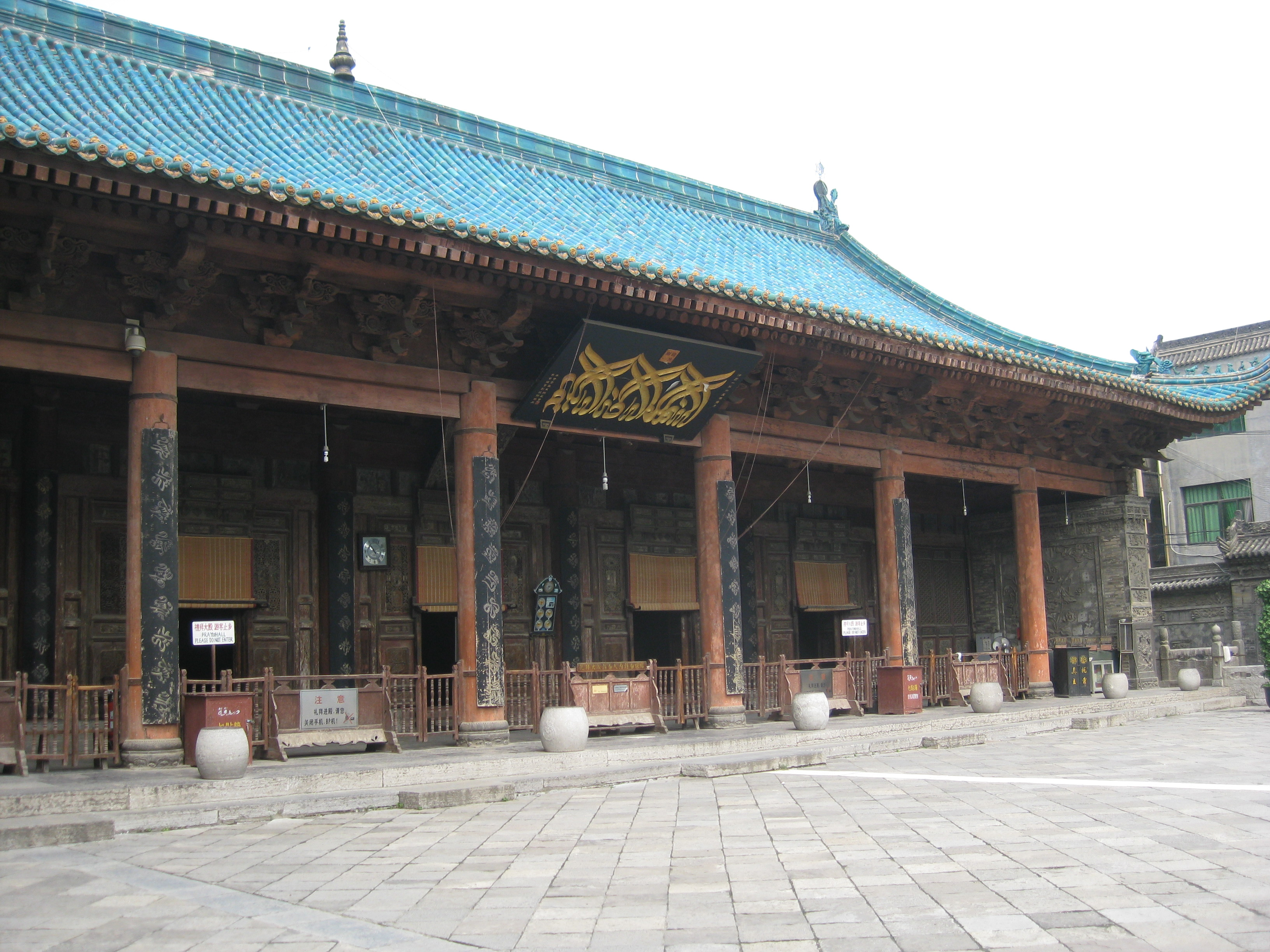
Prayer hall of the Great Mosque of Xi'an

The history of the Xi'an Muslim Quarter can be traced back to the Tang dynasty, when Muslim merchants came to and aggregated in Chang'an, today's Xi'an, via the Silk Road. After that, from the Five Dynasties to the Song dynasty, the Muslim population started to reside around Da Xuexi Street and Huajue Great Mosque. Later, in the Ming dynasty, the town hall of Xi'an was located beside the drum tower, which was a traditional building used for timing, quite close to the quarter. This aggregated a large number of wealthy merchants and thus nurtured a commercial lifestyle mainly led by the Muslim inside the quarter. Following the Ming dynasty, the "Three Mosque and Thirteen Blocks" pattern was formed in the Qing dynasty. Even though the Shan Gan Muslim Rebellion of the late Qing dynasty ruined a large number of Muslim neighborhoods in Northwestern China, Xi'an Muslim Quarter was not affected because of its highly commercial status and protected location inside the city wall. The Middle Mosque and the West Mosque were built in 1919 and 1920 respectively, further developing the quarter into a "Nine Mosques" pattern.

Later, with the founding of the People's Republic of China, most of religious activities in the mosques ceased, especially during the Cultural Revolution. The mosques in the quarter were either turned into factories or occupied by other organizations. During this period, only the Great Mosque and Sajinqiao West Mosque were in use. Such condition was changed by the policy "Basic stand and policy concerning religious problems during the Socialist Period" released by the Central Committee of the Chinese Communist Party, allowing the closed or occupied mosques to reopen. Moreover, several new mosques were built based on the previous pattern, and the quarter was eventually developed into a "Twelve Mosques" pattern.

== Residents ==
In China, Muslim residents have a typical living tradition known as "spread widely throughout the country, but concentrated in particular locations (da fensan xiao jizhong)". Muslim's living style of predominantly living in one or two regions contrasts with other ethnic groups in the country. Ma contends that this phenomenon is related to the Muslim's religious psychology. Due to the need to attend worship ceremonies, Muslims tend to live around mosques. This kind of living pattern is also observed in this area. Same as the Muslim people in other Chinese cities, most Muslim residents in this area conduct family-based businesses. Approximately 70% of the local residents in the area work in private businesses. As one of the busiest marketplaces within Xi'an historic urban core, this place is favorable to local businessmen, but also generates many traffic and environmental problems such as traffic jams and exhaust fumes in the narrow district roads. In addition, due to local dilapidated urban infrastructure, some residents and businessmen are accustomed to discharging used or contaminated water directly into the public sewage system, which often results in the blockage of sewage pipes. These problems have seriously affected the reputation and value of this historic district.

== Commercial ==
In addition to religion and ethnicity, the attachment of many Muslims to the Xi'an Muslim Quarter has much to do with the commercial opportunities the area can provide. As mentioned earlier, most local Muslim families conduct private businesses related to Muslim religion or Hui ethnic culture such as catering, butchery, antiques, and curios. To serve the business functions, many residential buildings facing the streets have been transformed into residential- cum-commercial compounds. Houses facing the public street have become shop-fronts for retail businesses selling, for example, beef and mutton, whereas the spaces behind are used to process meat. According to statistics, the number of tourist within Xi'an city wall area has doubled from 401,559 in 1992 to 867,273 in 2006. The commercial income in the area has also increased over 15 times from RMB99.5 million yuan in 1992 to RMB1,533.6 million yuan in 2006.

== Environment ==
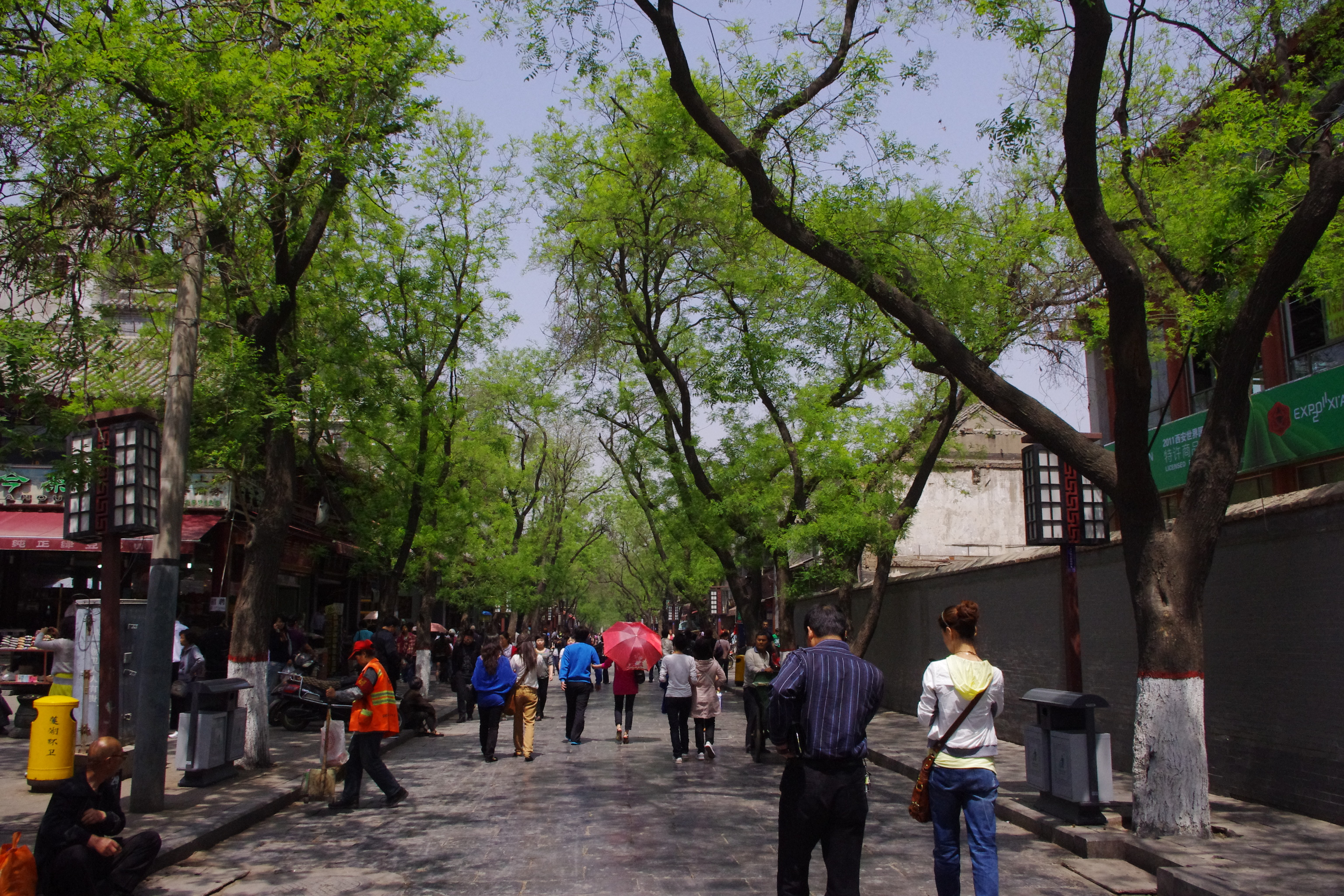
Beiyuanmen

Most area of the Xi'an Muslim Quarter is connected by narrow roads, causing much traffic congestion. Moreover, the Xi'an Muslim Quarter lacks necessary municipal amenities such as parking lots, public restrooms, and sewage systems. In 2005, Xi'an municipal Government planned to redevelop the area around Sajinqiao, but eventually abandoned the scheme because of the unrealistic project proposal and the issue of historical architecture preservation, and thus only renewed the area around Xida Avenue and Da Maishi Street.

== Food ==
The Muslim food in Xi'an can be traced back to the Tang dynasty. Later, it developed its special characteristic of mainly using beef and mutton and complementing with pastry. Today, the Xi'an Muslim Quarter is famous for its traditional foods and cultural activities. The traditional food is as follow:

=== Beef/lamb stew of bread ===
It is one of the most famous snacks in Xi'an. The pita is served to you first which you personally break into small pieces of your liking. The pita is then given to the chef, who places it into a wok of steaming broth, rice noodles and lamb. There are other various ingredients in the dish in it, such as green onion, garlic, coriander and so on.

=== Wooden cages mirror cake ===
Wooden cages mirror cake is a kind of Xi'an's traditional dessert. Small wooden molds are filled with ground stick rice and steamed. After the powder becomes soft and gooey, it is pulled out and covered in sugar, nuts and rose flavored jam. The cakes have a white color and are small and round, rather like a small mirror, hence its name.

=== Steamed soup dumplings ===
These are a special kind of dumplings. They have delicious tender meat, soft skin, exquisite shape, rich soup and oil but not greasy.

=== Meat skewers ===
Various kinds of meat skewers are available in the Xi'an Muslim Quarter, including lamb, squid, and beef. The skewers are covered with spices and roasted over hot coals.

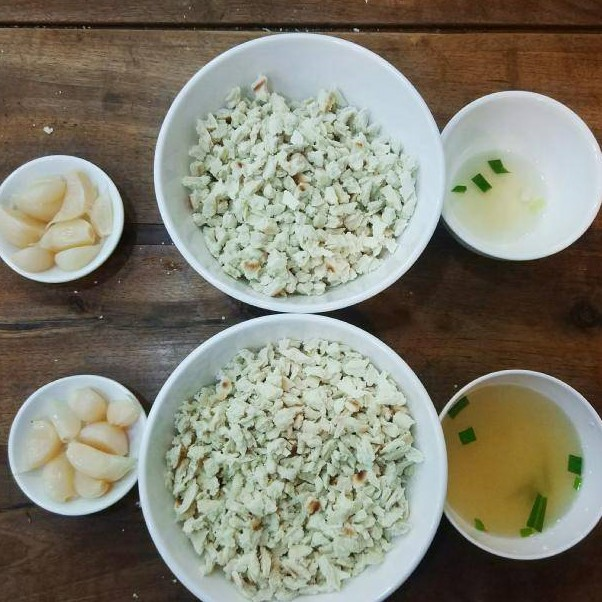
Beef stew of bread

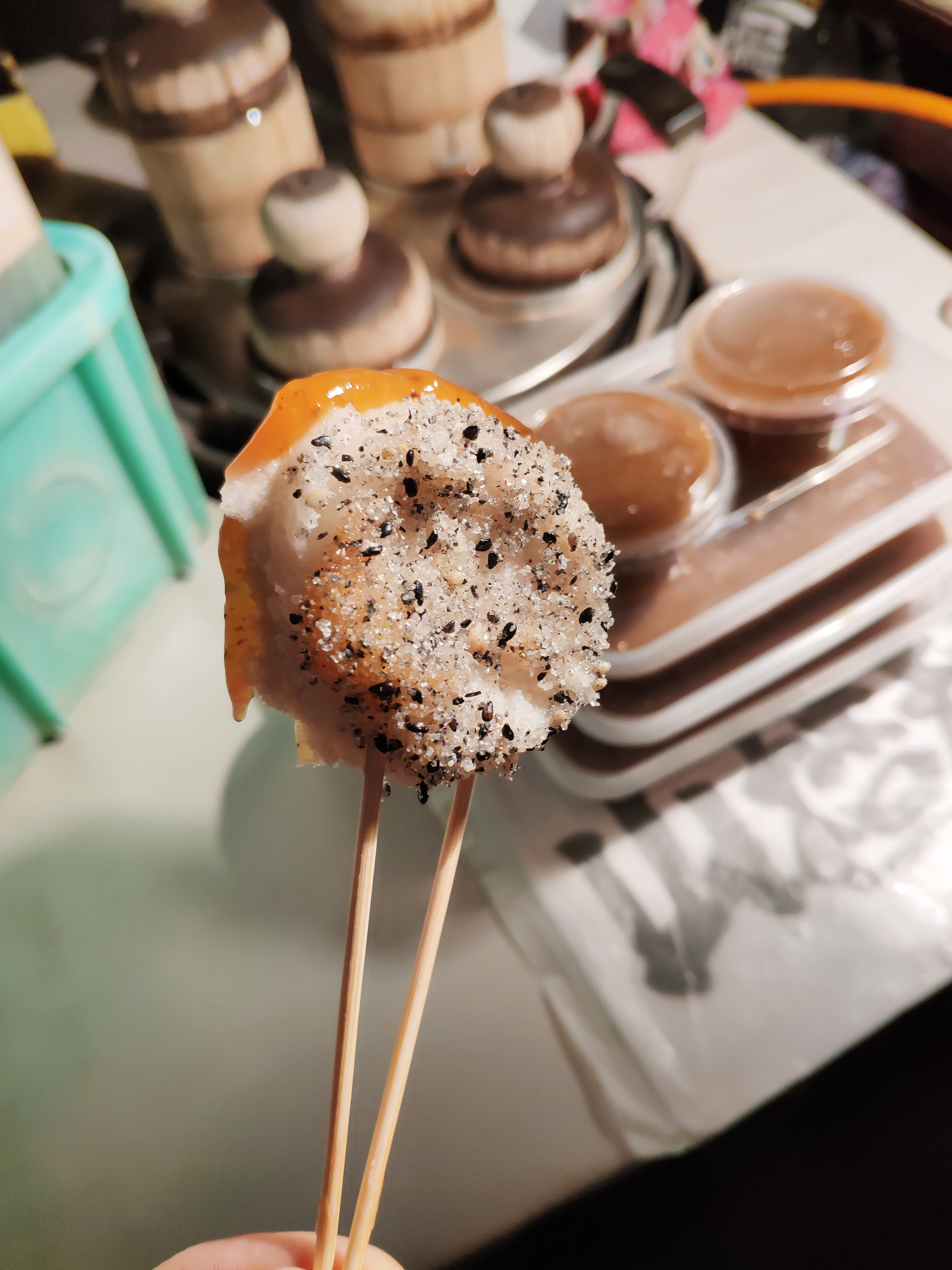
Wooden cages mirror cake

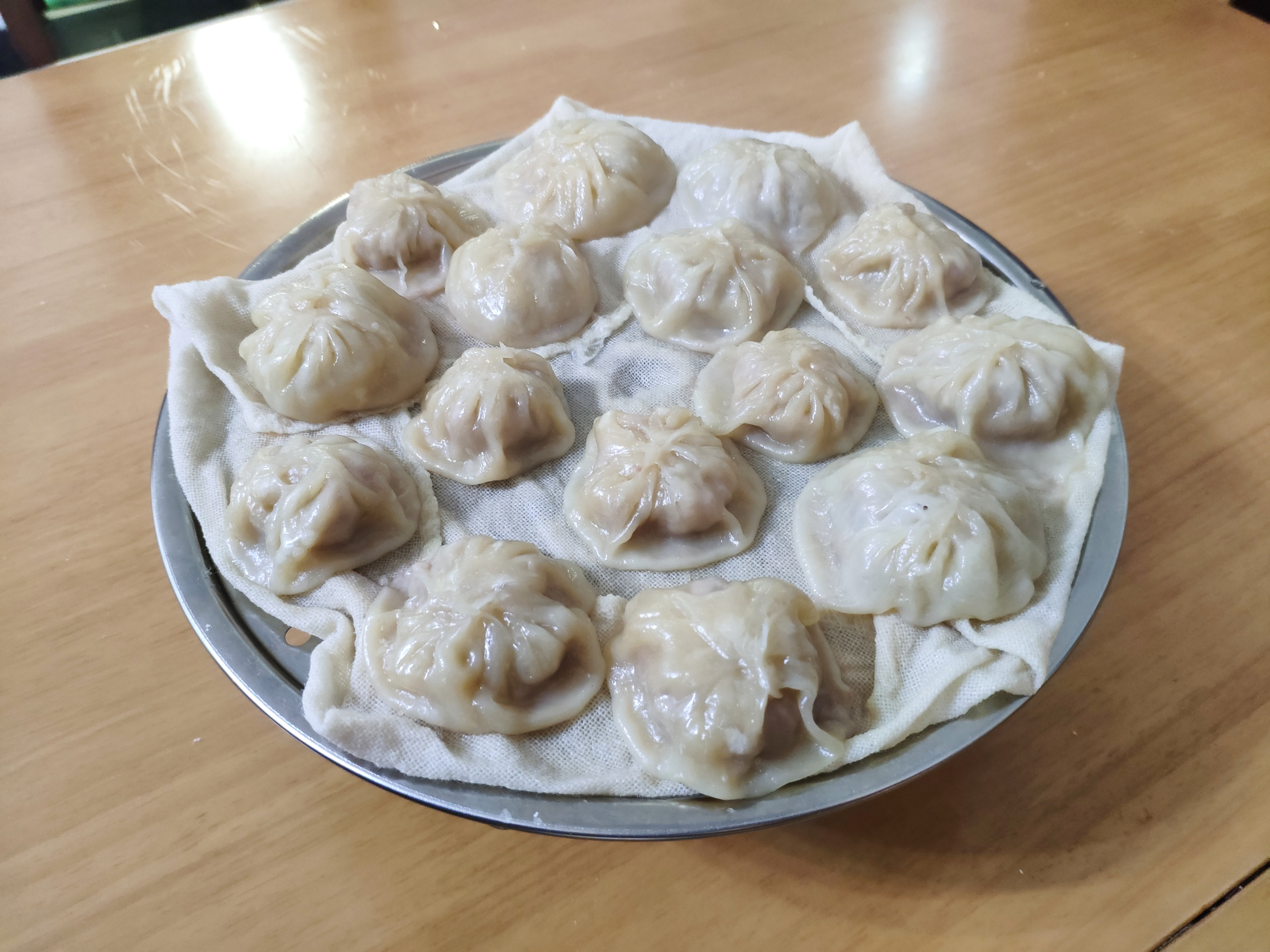
Steamed soup dumplings

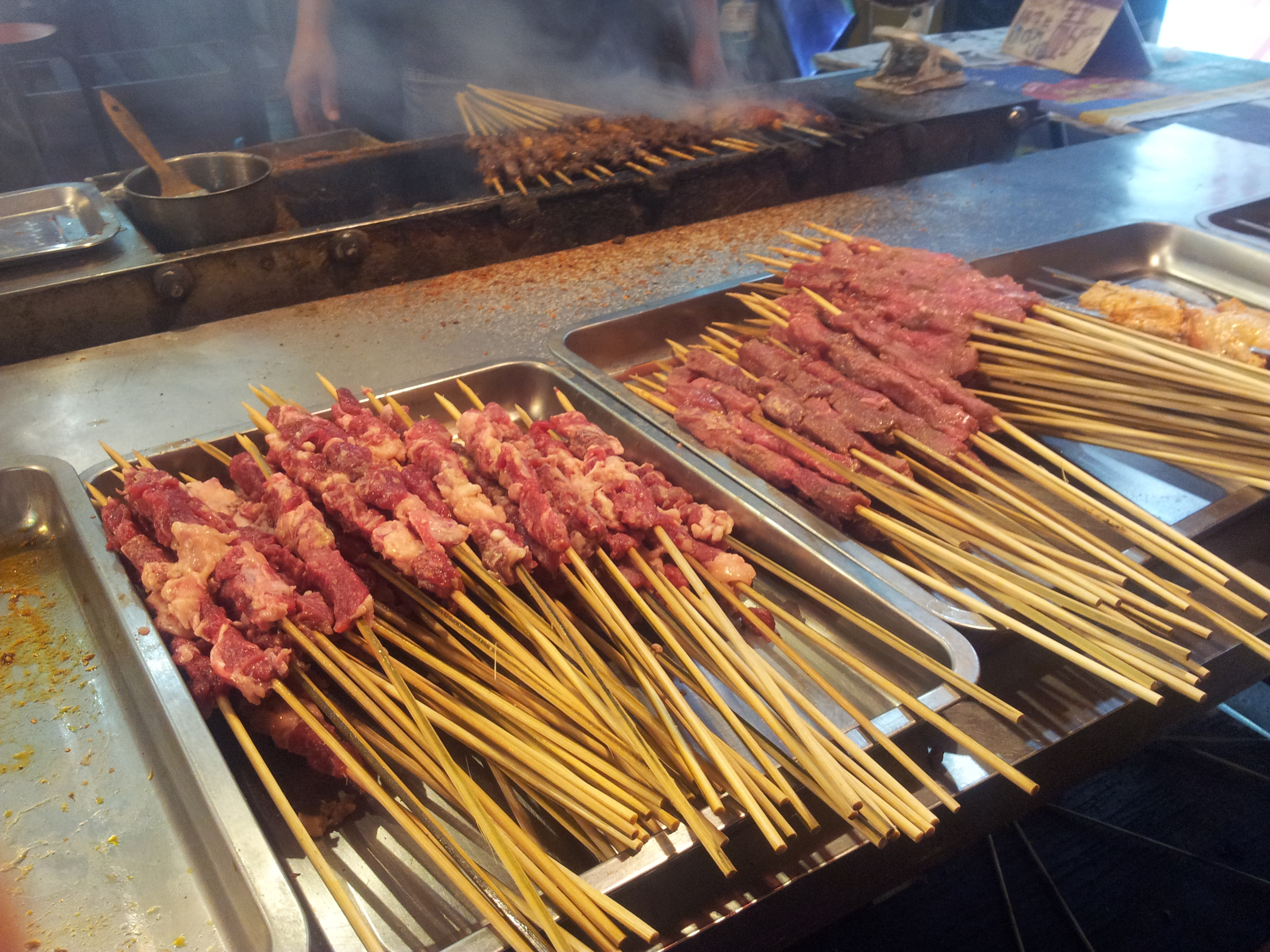
Meat skewers

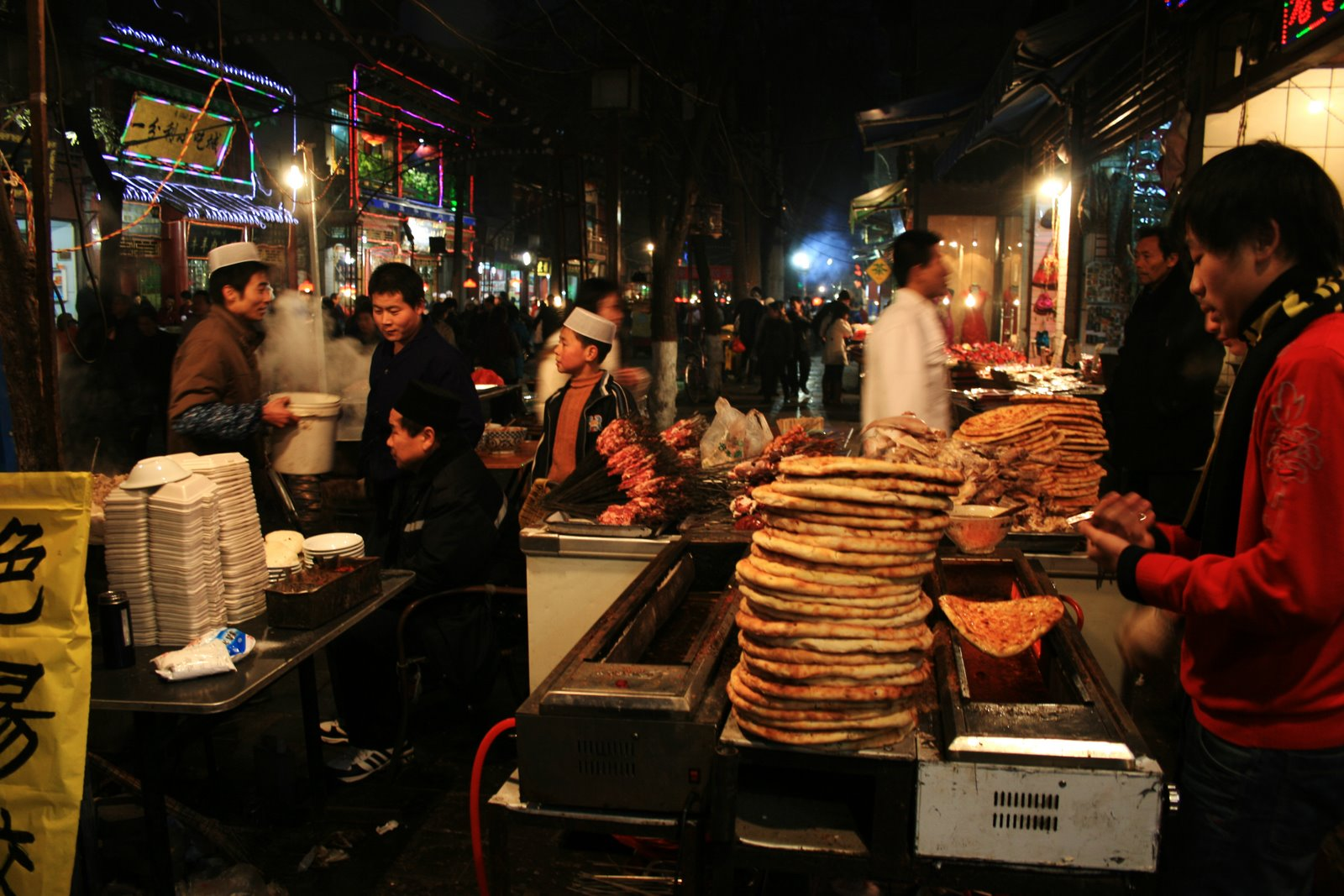
Food vendors in the Muslim quarter, Xi'an
