= Great Mosque of Xi'an =

Mosque in Xi'an, Shaanxi, China

- 西安大清真寺
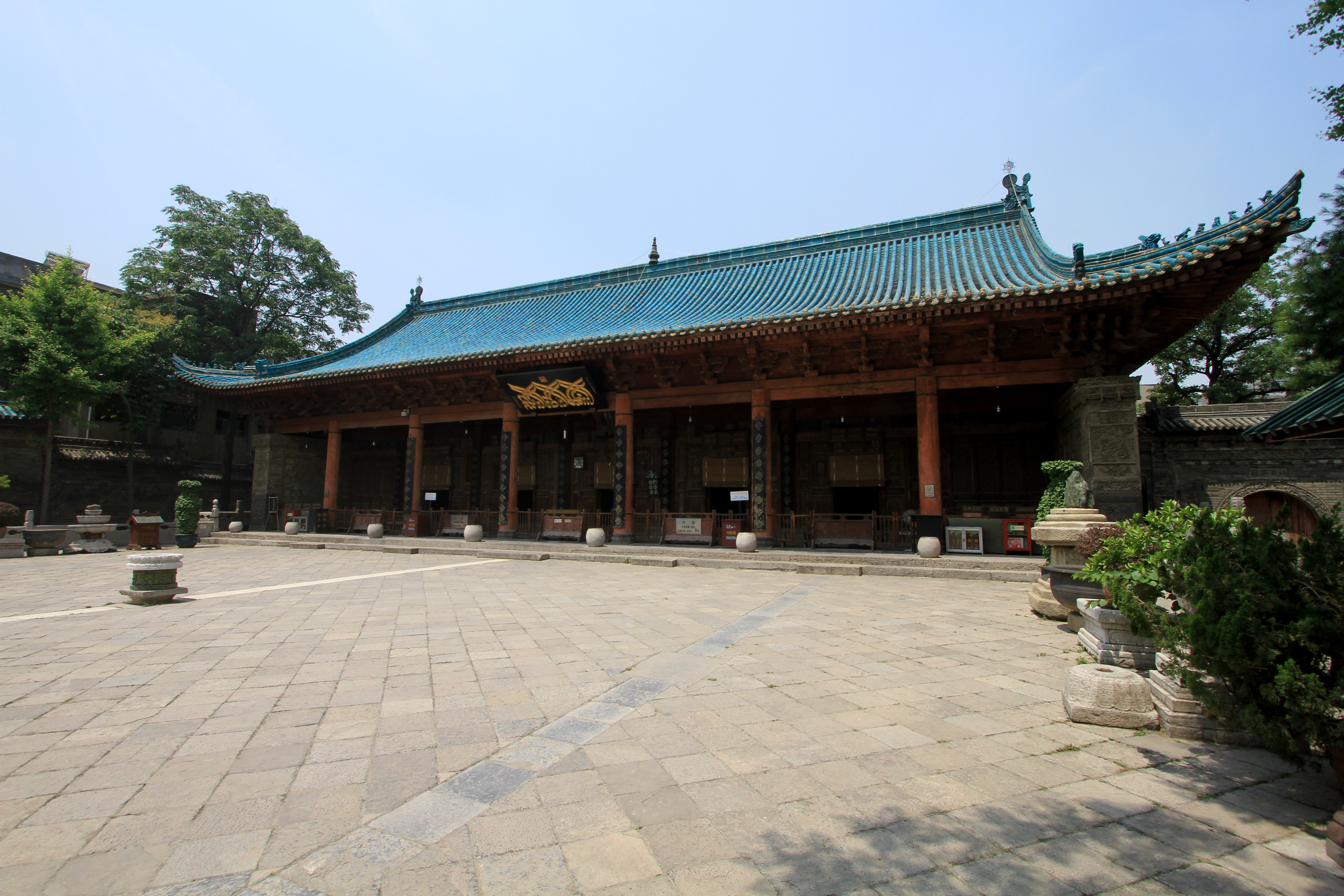
- Main building

- Location of the mosque in China

Religion
- Affiliation: Sunni Islam
- Sect: Hanafi
- Ecclesiastical or organisational status: Mosque
- Leadership: Islamic Association of China
- Status: Active

Location
- Location: Xi'an Muslim Quarter, Xi'an, Shaanxi
- Country: China
- Coordinates: 34°15′48″N 108°56′11″E

Architecture
- Type: Mosque
- Style: Sino-Islamic
- Completed: 742 CE (ancient); 1392 (current)

Specifications
- Capacity: 1,000 worshipers
- Site area: 1.23 ha (3.0 acres)

Major cultural heritage sites under national-level protection
- Official name: Great Mosque of Xi'an 西安大清真寺
- Type: Ancient building
- Criteria: Mosque
- Designated: 1988
- Reference no.: 3-135

Chinese name
- Simplified Chinese: 西安大清真寺
Transcriptions
Standard Mandarin
- Hanyu Pinyin: Xī'ān Dà Qīngzhēnsì

The Great Mosque of Xi'an (Chinese: 西安大清真寺; pinyin: Xī'ān Dà Qīngzhēnsì; Arabic: مسجد شيان), also known as the Huajue Xiang Mosque (化觉巷清真寺; Huàjué Xiàng Qīngzhēnsì) due to its location on 30 Huajue Lane, and is sometimes called the Great Eastern Mosque (东大寺; Dōng Dàsì), (Note: The Daxuexi Alley Mosque (大学习巷清真寺; Dàxuéxí Xiàng Qīngzhēnsì) sits on the other side of the Muslim Quarter and is known as the "Western Mosque" of Xi'an.) is a mosque located in the eastern segments of the Xi'an Muslim Quarter (回民街), Xi'an, in the Shaanxi province of China.

It is one of the largest premodern mosques in China. Traditional accounts date the mosque's founding to 742 CE during the Tang dynasty, at the time when Xi'an (Chang'an) was the world's largest city, its current form was largely constructed in 1392 CE during Emperor Hongwu's reign of the Ming dynasty, as recorded by the Records of Xi'an Municipality (西安府志). The mosque's plan is distinguished by its symmetrically east-west axis plan with five sahns that include several buildings with the prayer hall being at the west end of the mosque, this plan follows the native Chinese architectural traditions and it is different from mosques outside of China.

An active place of worship within the Xi'an Muslim Quarter, this sahn complex is also a popular tourist site. It now houses more than twenty buildings in its five sahns, and covers 1.23 hectares (3.0 acres).

== History ==
=== Tang and Song dynasties ===
Chang'an, as the cosmopolitan capital of China's Tang dynasty, had sizable non-Han merchant and artisan communities that resided there. Many of them migrated to China from today's West Asia. Emperor Xuanzong decreed around the year 742 CE (as Tangmingsi, 唐明寺) that a place of worship for the Muslim community was to be constructed in the city. It has been argued that, around the same time, mosques for the immigrant population in Quanzhou and Guangzhou were being built. There is evidence that the early mosque was used during the Song dynasty due to the presence of an imperial plaque placed in the mosque issued by the Song government.

Due to the collapse of the Tang dynasty and later the Song dynasty, most parts of the original mosque constructed in the Tang dynasty did not survive. The mosque was reconstructed at least four times before taking its modern shape. At around the 1260s, the then deteriorating mosque was rebuilt by the Yuan government as Huihui Wanshansi (回回万善寺).

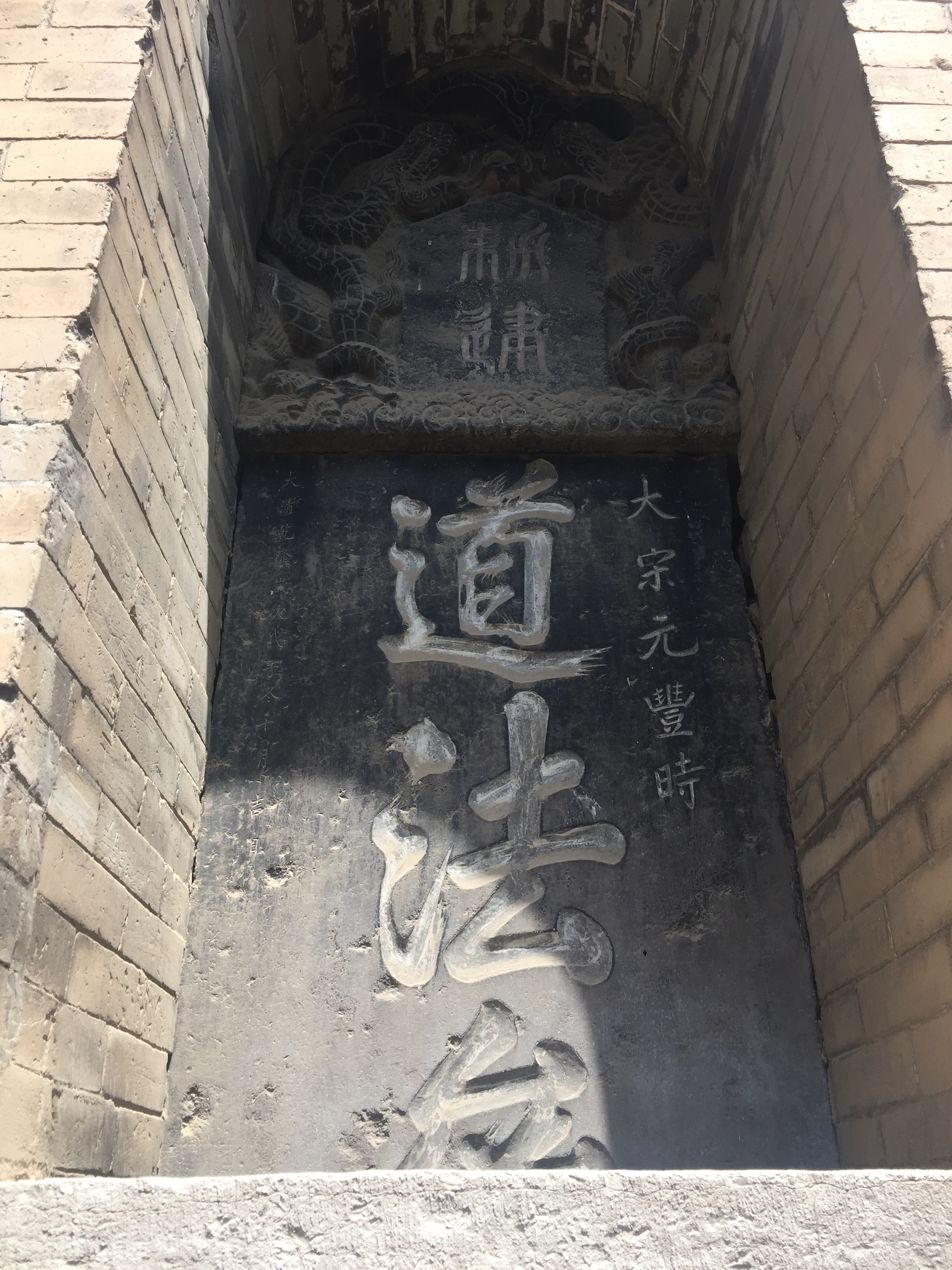
Plaque stating "The platform of the Tao" written by Emperor Shenzong of the Song dynasty. This plaque demonstrates that the original Tangmingsi was used during the early Song dynasty. It also demonstrated considerable efforts by the Muslim community to assimilate into mainstream Han Chinese community, in which they succeeded in doing so.

The Mongol conquest of China witnessed a large immigration of Muslims into China. Many were relocated by the Mongol Yuan rulers to serve as bureaucrats and merchants in China. The foreign, often Muslim, population brought into China by the Mongol regime were known in Chinese as People with Coloured Eyes/Semu People (色目人), many of whom originated from the recently Islamized regions such as Kara-Khanid Xinjiang and Persia. Despite moving into and permanently settling in China, many of the Muslim immigrants and their descendants did not give up their Islamic faith nor "foreign" identity. Many of these new Chinese residents intermarried with the local Han population, forming and consolidating the foundations of the genetically diverse ethnic Hui population in China.

=== Reconstruction during the Ming dynasty ===
The city of Xi'an, after being destroyed during the collapse of the Tang dynasty, was reconstructed during the Ming dynasty by 1378 CE. The reconstruction of the original mosque into its contemporary form was patronized by the imperial government during Emperor Hongwu's reign. The mosque witnessed further additions during the Qing dynasty, which included the mosque's front gate, Paifang, and Sebil. Evidence of official patronage of the mosque is present in the form of plaques placed in the Mosque. For instance, a plaque stating the Declaration of the Reconstruction of the Mosque (敕赐重修清真寺碑) was placed there in 1606 during the Ming dynasty. Another plaque called Declaration to Fix the Mosque (敕修清真寺碑) was placed there by the Qing government in 1768.

It has been widely argued that although the Hui community largely adhered to their religious identity, they gravitated and later adopted the mainstream Han Chinese cultural traditions as encouraged by the Ming and later Qing governments. However, certain restrictions on the practice of Islam occurred after the Dungan Revolt (1862–1877), which started because of ethnic and religious tensions between the Muslims and the Han Chinese. The revolt led to riots and mass killing from both sides. After the Dungan Revolt the Qing government limited Muslim freedom of worship. The ritual slaughtering of animals was forbidden. The construction of new mosques and the pilgrimage to Mecca were prohibited, though these restrictions were lifted after the overthrowing of the Qing dynasty. Today, the Great Mosque of Xi'an and its surrounding area have been developed as the center of the Hui population of Xi'an.

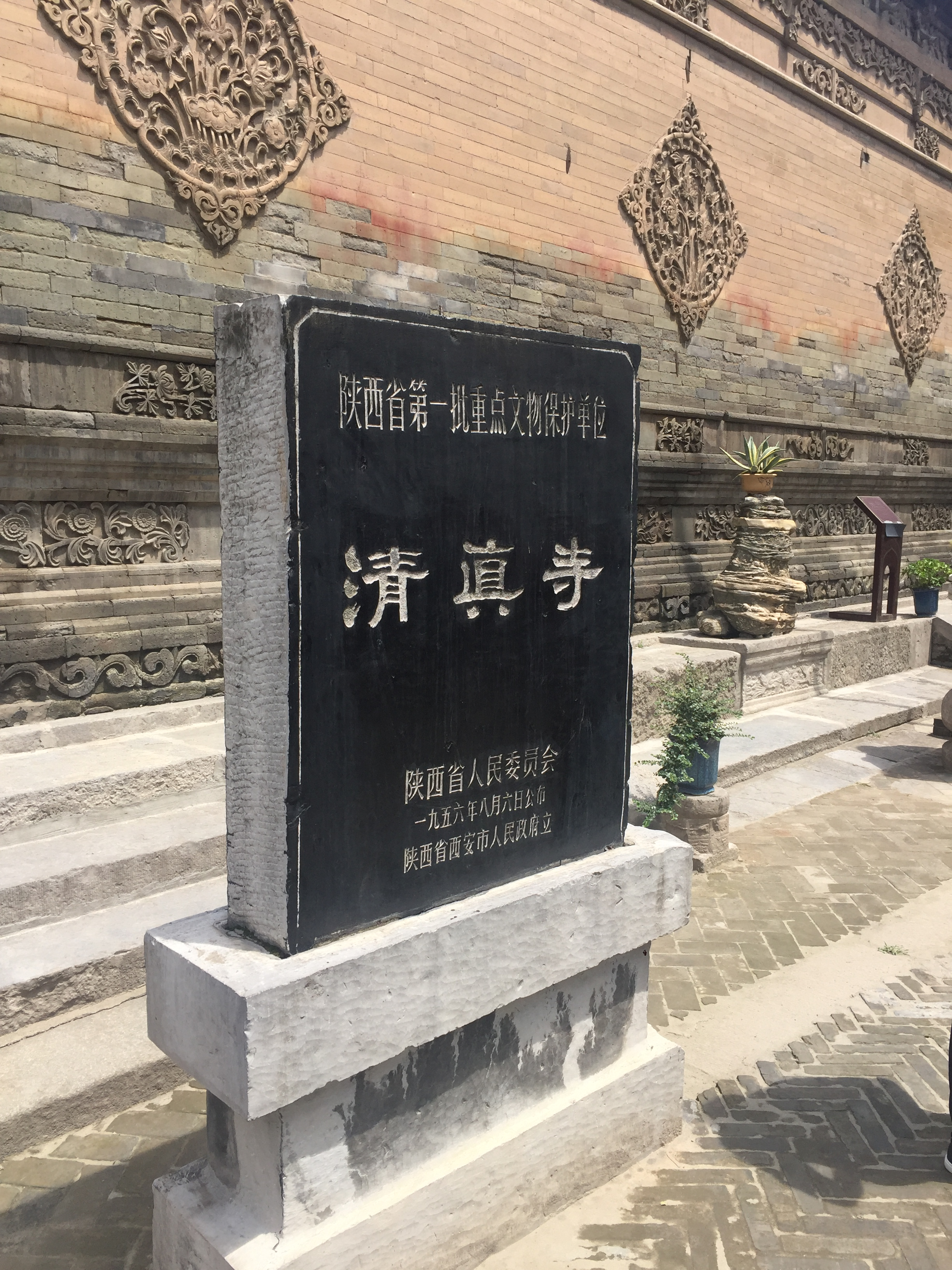
Plaque displaying that the Great Mosque of Xi'an was declared a Historical and Cultural Site Protected at the Shaanxi Province Level on August 6, 1956.

In 1956, the government of the People's Republic of China declared the mosque to be a Historical and Cultural Site Protected at the Shaanxi Province Level. However, during the Cultural Revolution, as with practically all other religious facilities in mainland China, the mosque was temporarily shut down and converted into a steel factory. Following Mao Zedong's death in 1976, religious activities resumed, and the mosque was listed as a Chinese major cultural heritage site in 1988. In 1997, it was selected as one of the top ten tourist attractions in Xi'an.

=== Modern usage ===
The mosque is used as a place of worship by Chinese Muslims, primarily the Hui people. The Great Mosque of Xi'an represents the Gedimu (Chinese: 格迪目, Arabic: قديم) tradition of Sunni Islam with the Hanafi jurisdiction, which is the majority jurisprudence that the Hui population follow. The main prayer hall of the Great Mosque of Xi'an can accommodate 1,000 people though around 100 worshipers attend a typical Friday service today. Visitors and tourists can pay a small fee to enter and complex and see the gardens and steles but non-Muslims are not allowed to enter the prayer hall.

The mosque is a religious site to the Muslims in the city, and a cultural heritage site to all citizens of Xi'an. It is used to represent the ethnic and religious diversity that the city had in the past.

== Architecture ==
The Great Mosque of Xi'an is an example of the adaptability of mosque architecture in the context of Chinese culture. The mosque has features that mosque around the world typically have, such as the qibla and mihrab, and it also contains Chinese architectural features and cultural symbols throughout.

=== Chinese style ===
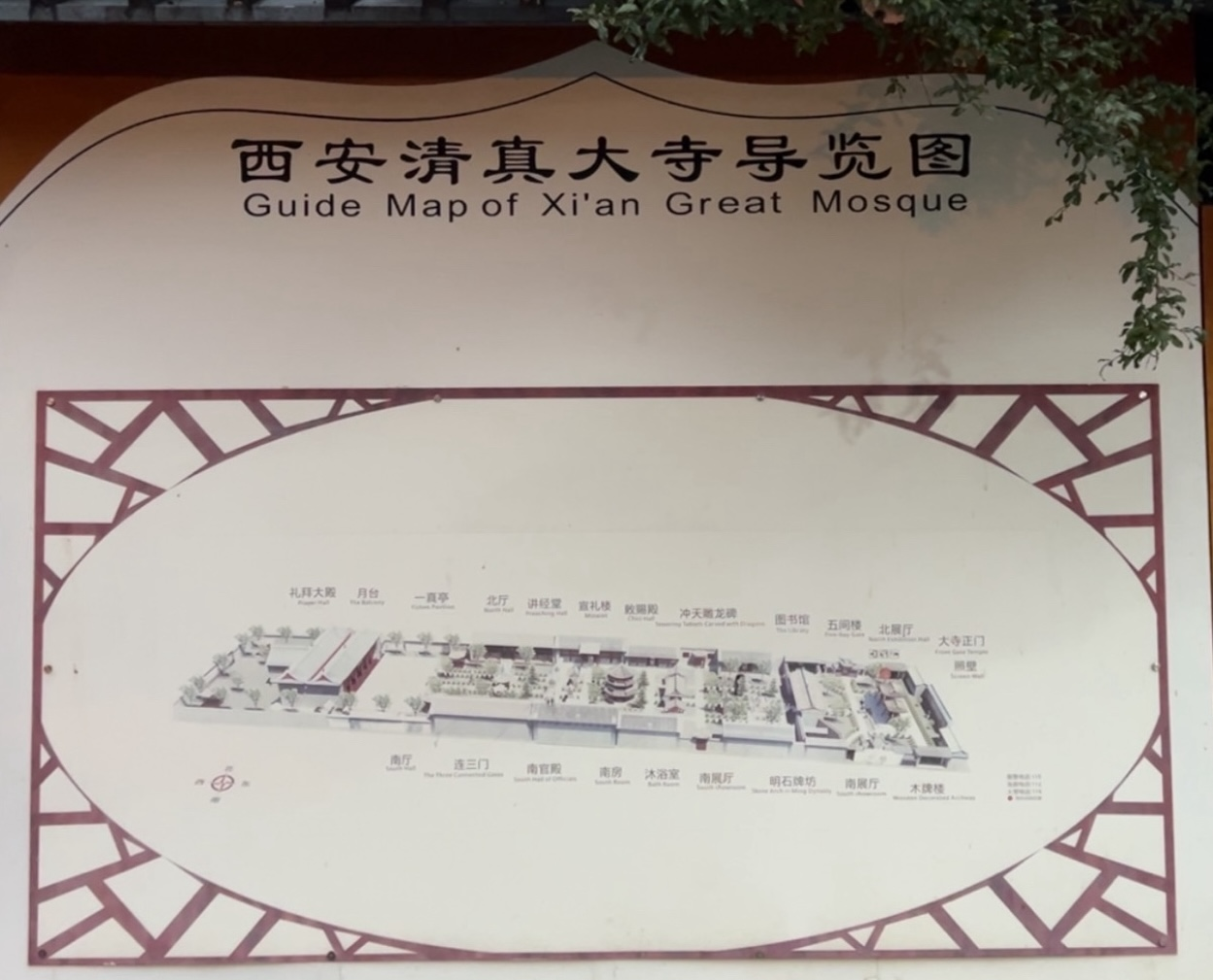
East to west axis plan of the mosque, with the prayer hall at the west end, minaret building in the middle and the entrance from the east.

Overall, the mosque, like the majority of Chinese mosques built between the Ming and Qing periods, combines a traditional Chinese architectural form with Islamic functionality. Though the mosque was constructed using traditional Chinese forms, unlike most buildings that follow a north–south axis in accordance with feng shui (most Chinese religious buildings have their gates open in the north direction), the mosque is oriented toward west, the direction of Mecca, with its entrance from the east. The mosque's complex Chinese axis plan with the prayer hall located at the west-end is distinguished from the traditional square or rectangular complex plans with the prayer hall located at the center.

Calligraphy in both Chinese and Perso-Arabic script appears throughout the complex. The Arabic texts, such as the Shahada, can be seen written in the Sini calligraphic style, which is the style of Arabic calligraphy using Chinese-influenced medium, such as the usage of the Chinese ink brush for writing.

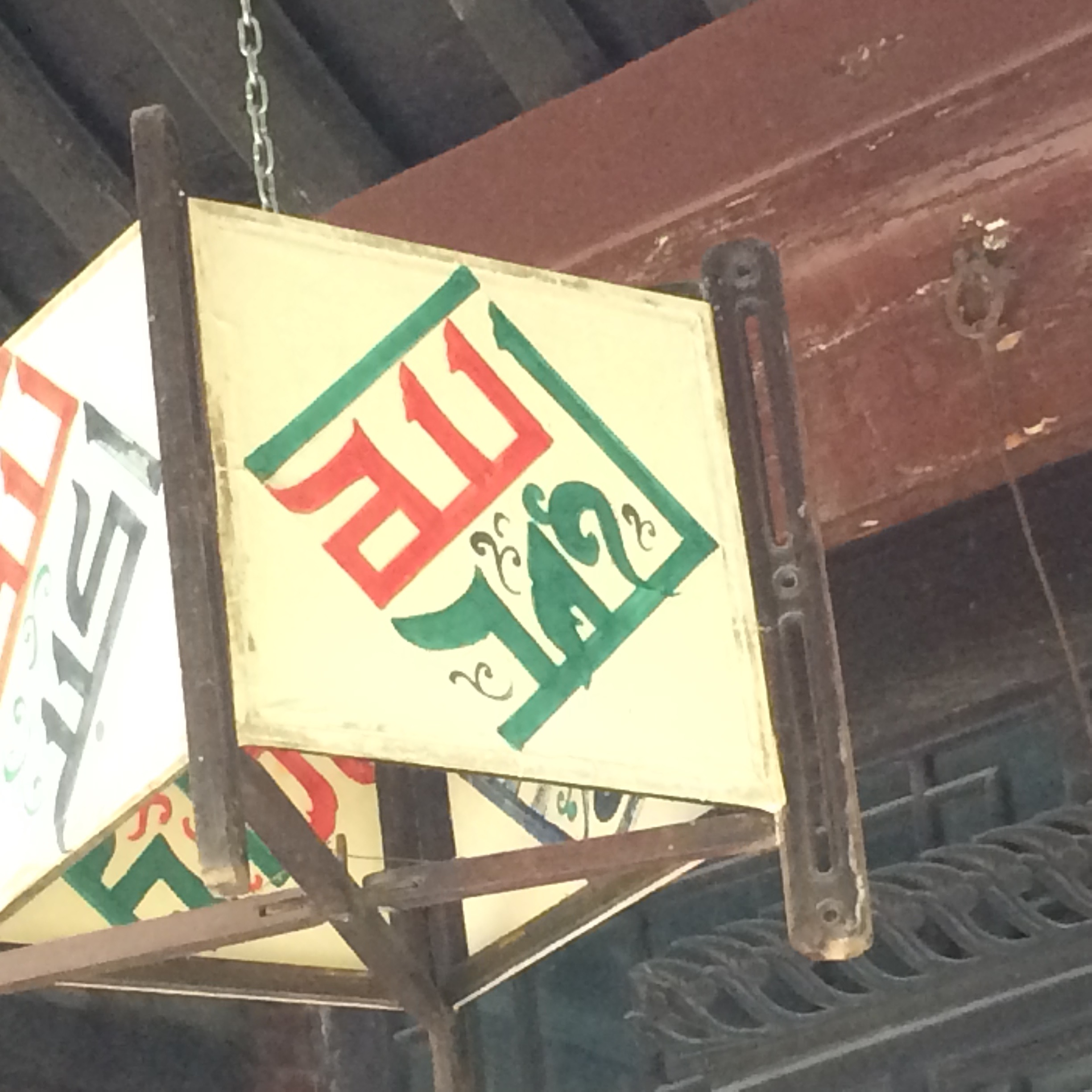
Taḥmīd ("Praise be to God") in Arabic Ṣīnī-style calligraphy at the Great Mosque of Xi'an

=== Sahns ===
The mosque is a walled complex of four sahns, with the prayer hall located in the fourth and also the westmost sahn. The first and second sahns are mostly traditional Chinese gardens, while the third and fourth sahns are where the main structures of the mosques are located. The sahns are divided by walls and connected by gateways. Most of the architectural features present in the sahns were constructed during or after the Ming dynasty. However, there are artefacts dating from earlier than the Ming dynasty, such as the plaques on the gates of the second sahn, which were plaque carvings dated from the Song dynasty. Each sahn contains a central monument, such as a gate, and is lined with greenery as well as subsidiary buildings.

Paifangs (牌坊) frame all the sahns. They are imperially commissioned arches that commemorate those that have contributed to the state. Some scholars claim that the number of paifangs in the sahn implies that the Muslim Hui community were treated as equal citizens, in the same way as Han citizens. The first sahn, for instance, contains a Qing dynasty monumental gate, while the fourth sahn houses the Phoenix Pavilion, a hexagonal gazebo. Walls throughout the complex are carved with plant and object motifs, and inscriptions in both Chinese and Arabic. Stone steles record repairs done to the mosque and feature calligraphic works. In the second sahn, two steles display texts that promote ethnic harmony (for instance, as attached in the figure above, one of the steles draws upon prominent connections between the Islamic faith and Taoism), one of them supposedly featuring scripts of the calligrapher Mi Fu of the Song dynasty.

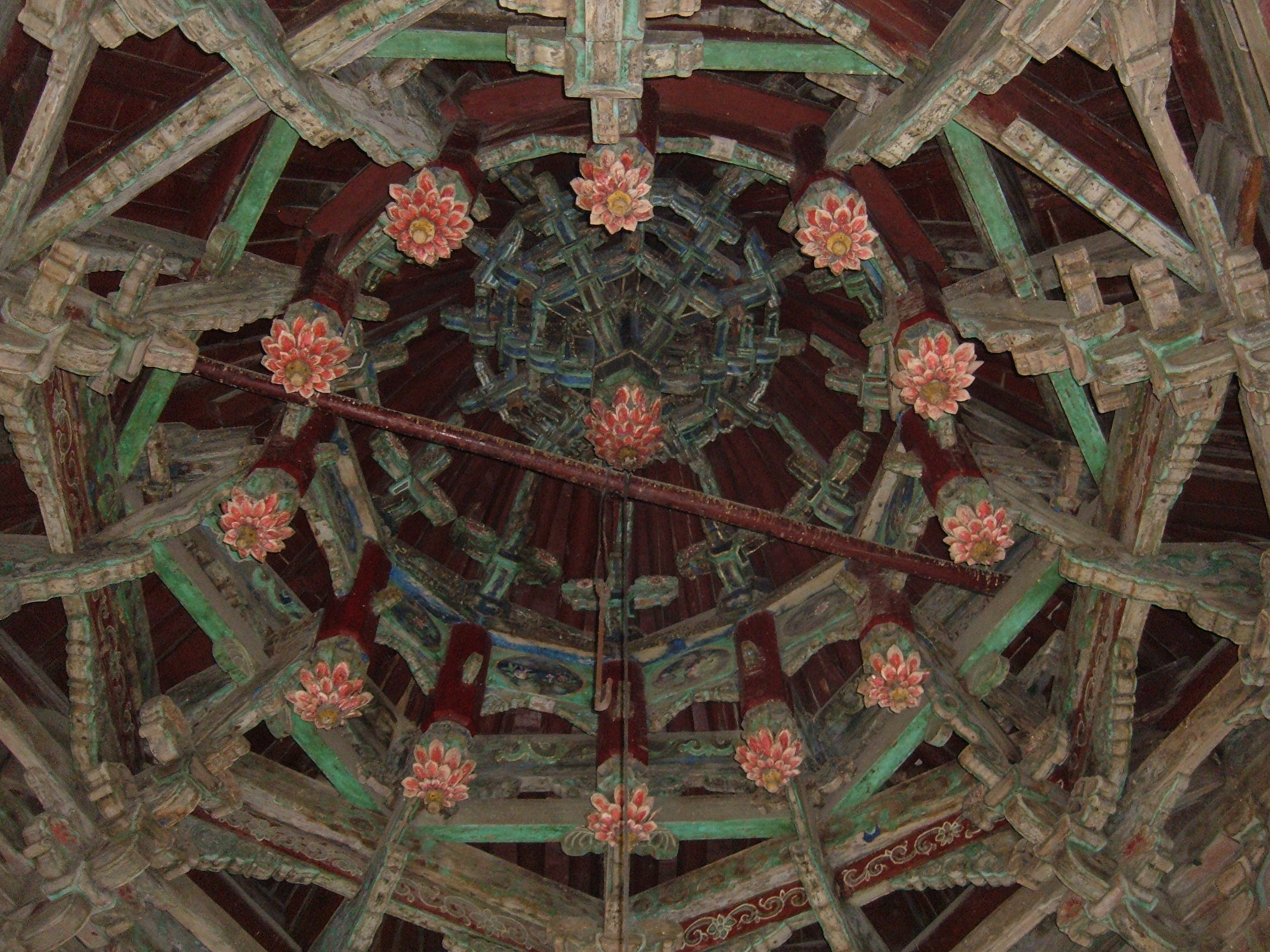
Inside the Phoenix Pavilion

The Shengxinlou (省心楼), or "Examining the Heart Tower," is a three-story, octagonal pagoda in the third sahn. The structure contains a number of steles dating to as early as the Tang dynasty. The presence of these, often large, steles have been used to support the Tang establishment of the mosque. Despite the usage of this complex as a mosque, the Great Mosque of Xi'an is notable for lacking a minaret. However, some scholars, such as Dr. Nancy Steinhardt from the University of Pennsylvania, speculate that the Xingxin Tower originally served as the mosque's minaret that was previously used for the call to prayer. This sahn is for visitors to attend prayer services. Today, the third courtyard is where many of the mosque community's daily activities take place. For instance, the mosque's central kitchen, the residential Imam's office, and other governmental administrative departments are located here.

The fourth sahn has a bigger prayer hall that can seat more than a thousand people.

=== Prayer hall ===
It is believed that the prayer hall was constructed during the Ming dynasty, although significant reconstructions occurred during the Qing era. This argument has been supported by the numerous wooden columns in the prayer hall as the use of wooden columns predates that of brick columns which were typical of Qing dynasty buildings. The prayer hall is a monumental timber building with a turquoise hip roof, painted dougong (wooden brackets), a six-pillared portico, and five doors. Contrary to most mosques in many Muslim-majority states, the prayer hall does not feature a dome-shaped ceiling but has a traditional Chinese, pointy ceiling covered with ceramic decorative tiles. Meanwhile, the prayer hall is decorated with images of plants and flowers, suggesting the decorative program still followed the Islamic tradition that forbids anthropomorphic imageries. The ceiling is raised upon a large stone platform lined with wooden balustrades. The expansive prayer hall consists of three conjoined buildings, set one behind the other. In the furthest part of the prayer hall stands the rear qibla wall, which has wooden carvings of floral and calligraphic designs. A 2014 study states that the Qur’anic inscriptions on wooden panels along the interior walls of the prayer hall begin with the Bismillah and surah 1 and continue through surah 114.

== Gallery ==
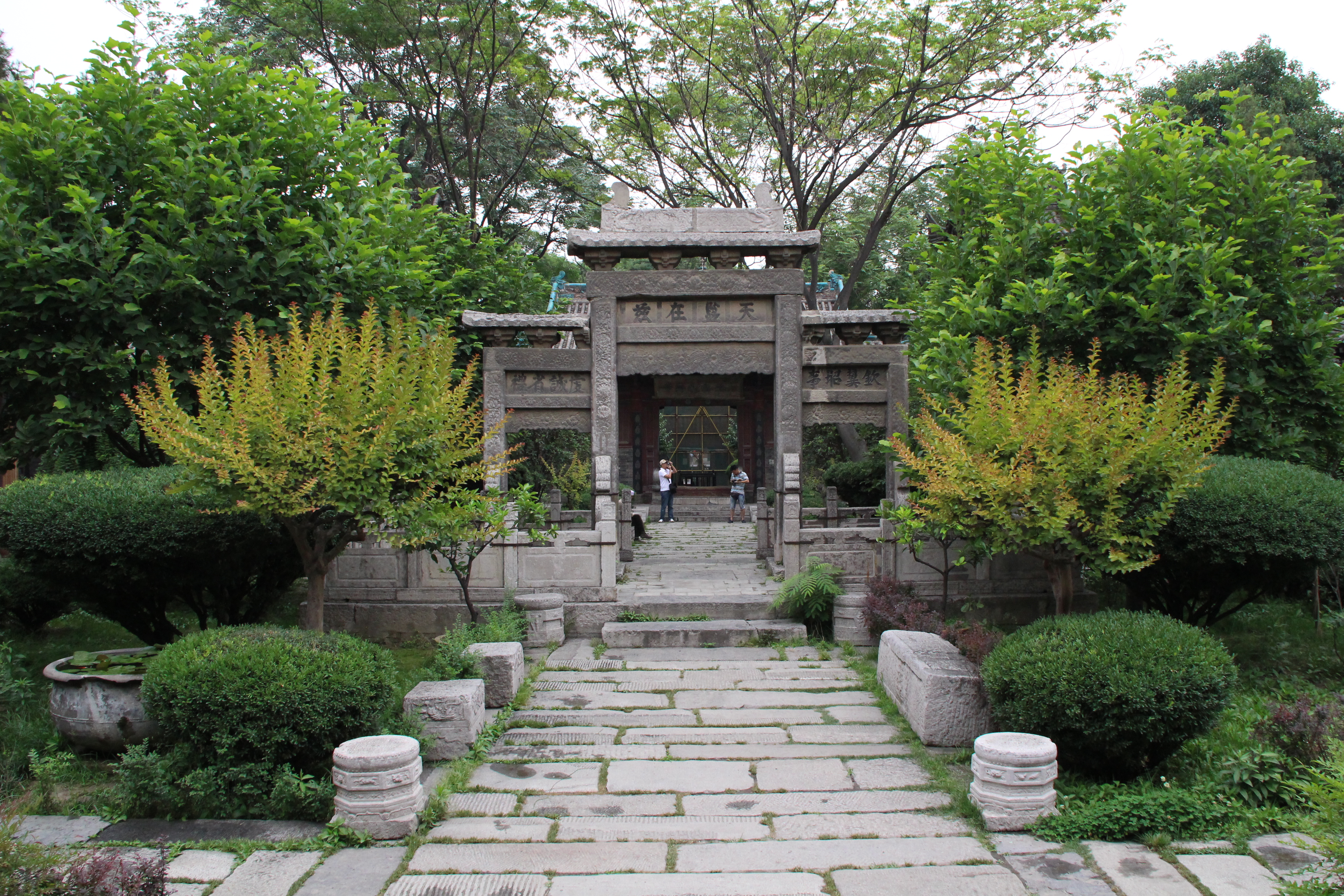
Second sahn of the great mosque

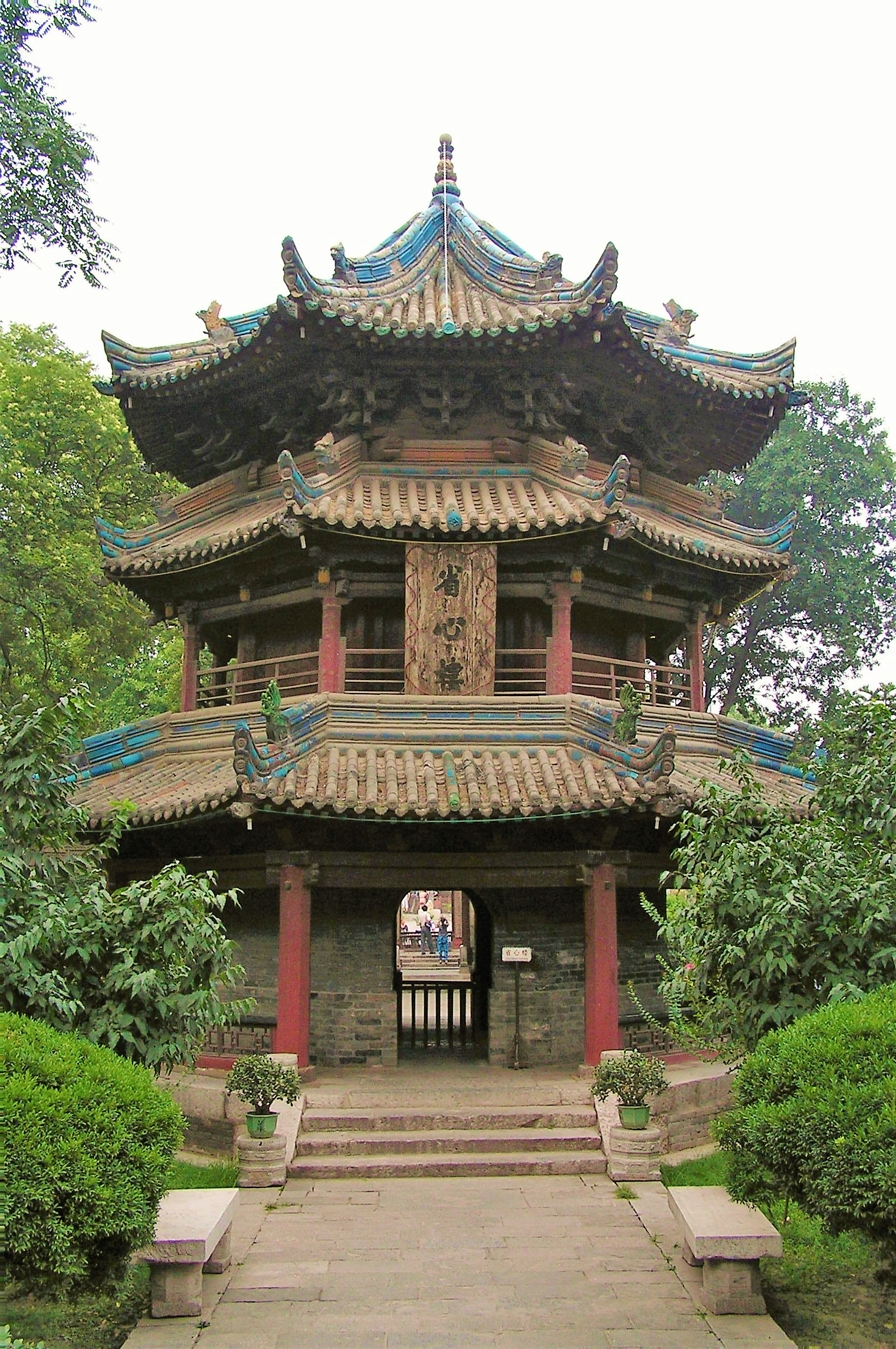
"Examining the Heart Tower" (minaret) in the third sahn

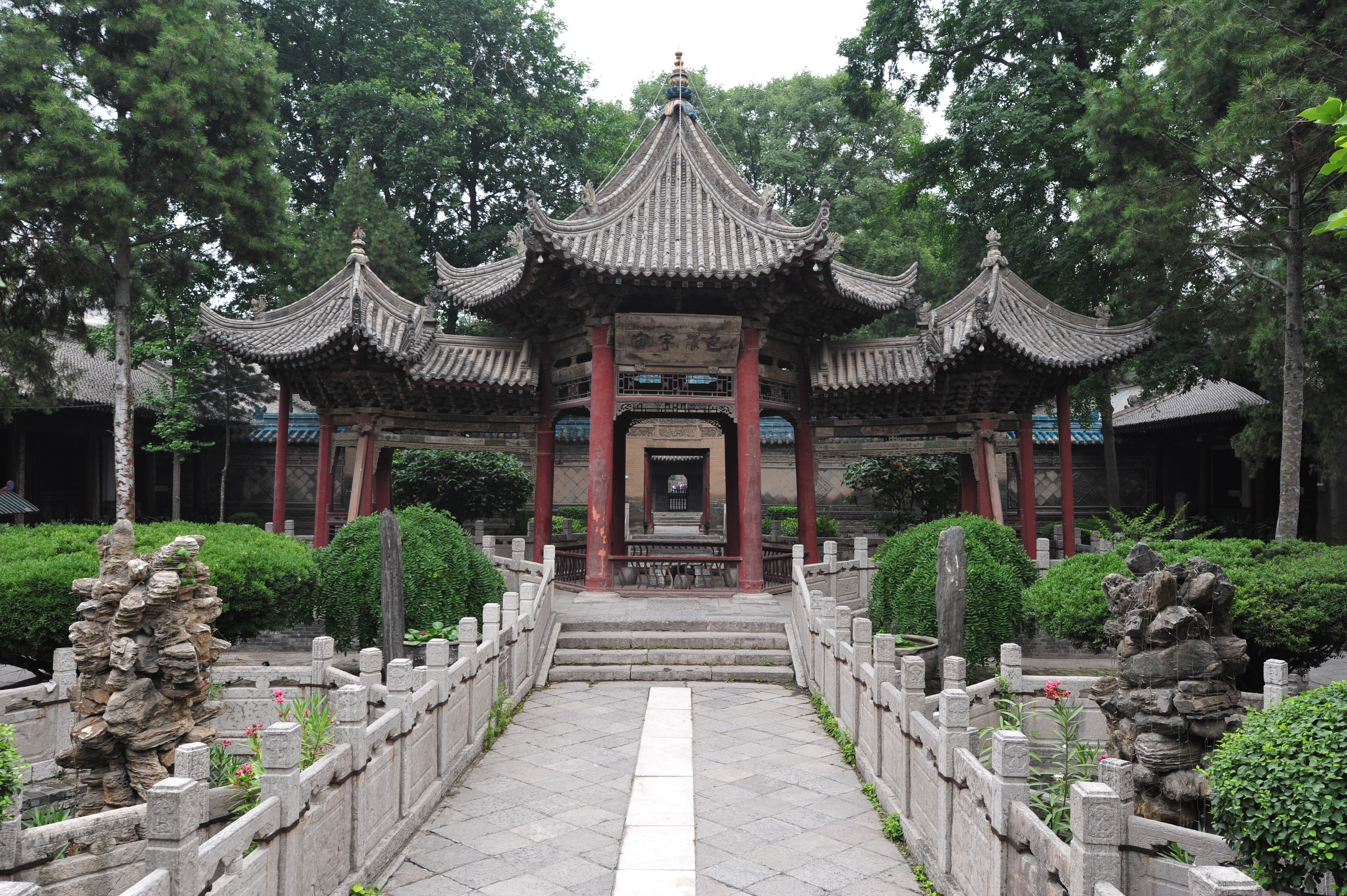
Phoenix Pavilion in the fourth sahn

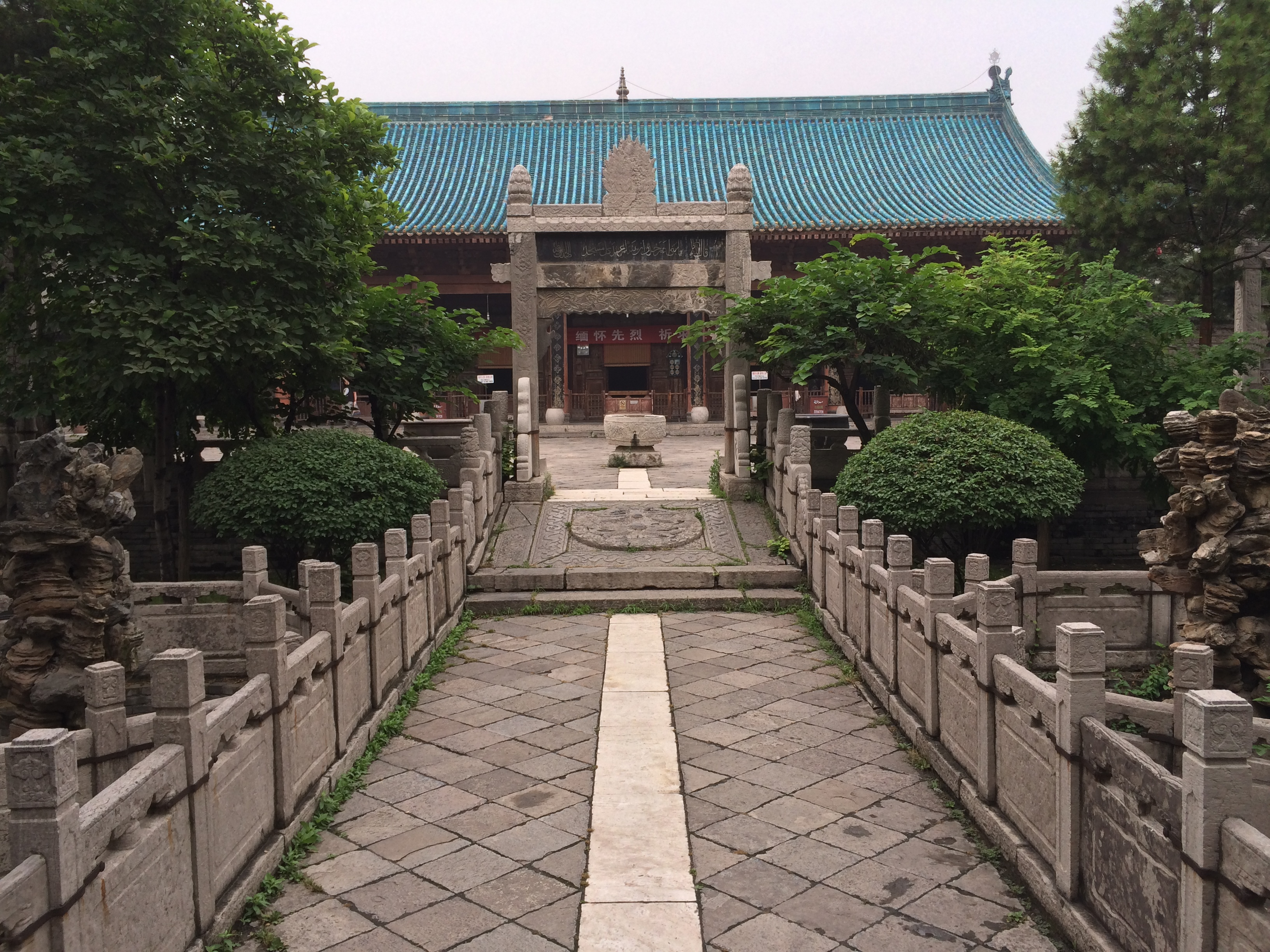
Facing the prayer hall of the mosque, in the fourth sahn

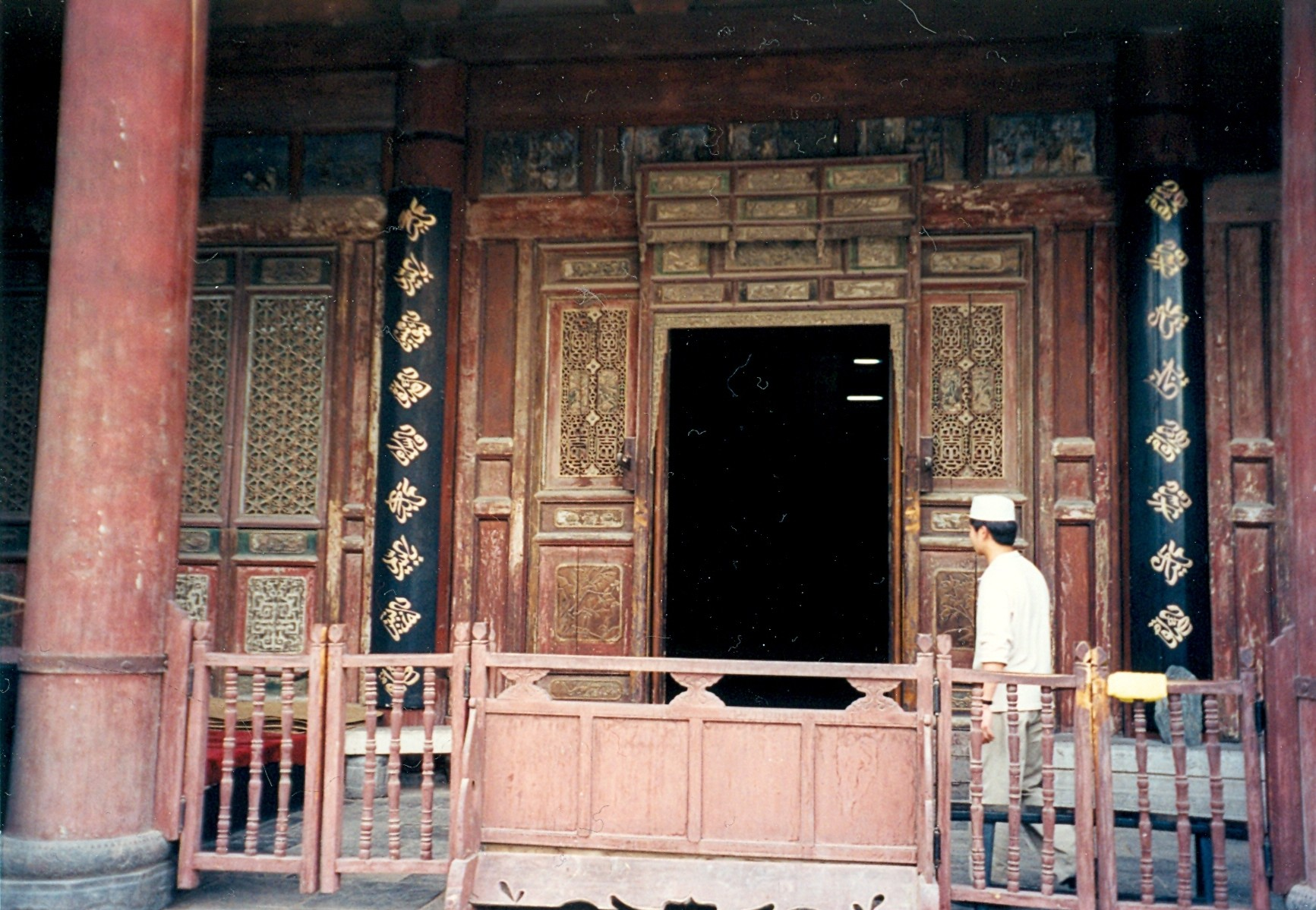
Entrance to the prayer hall

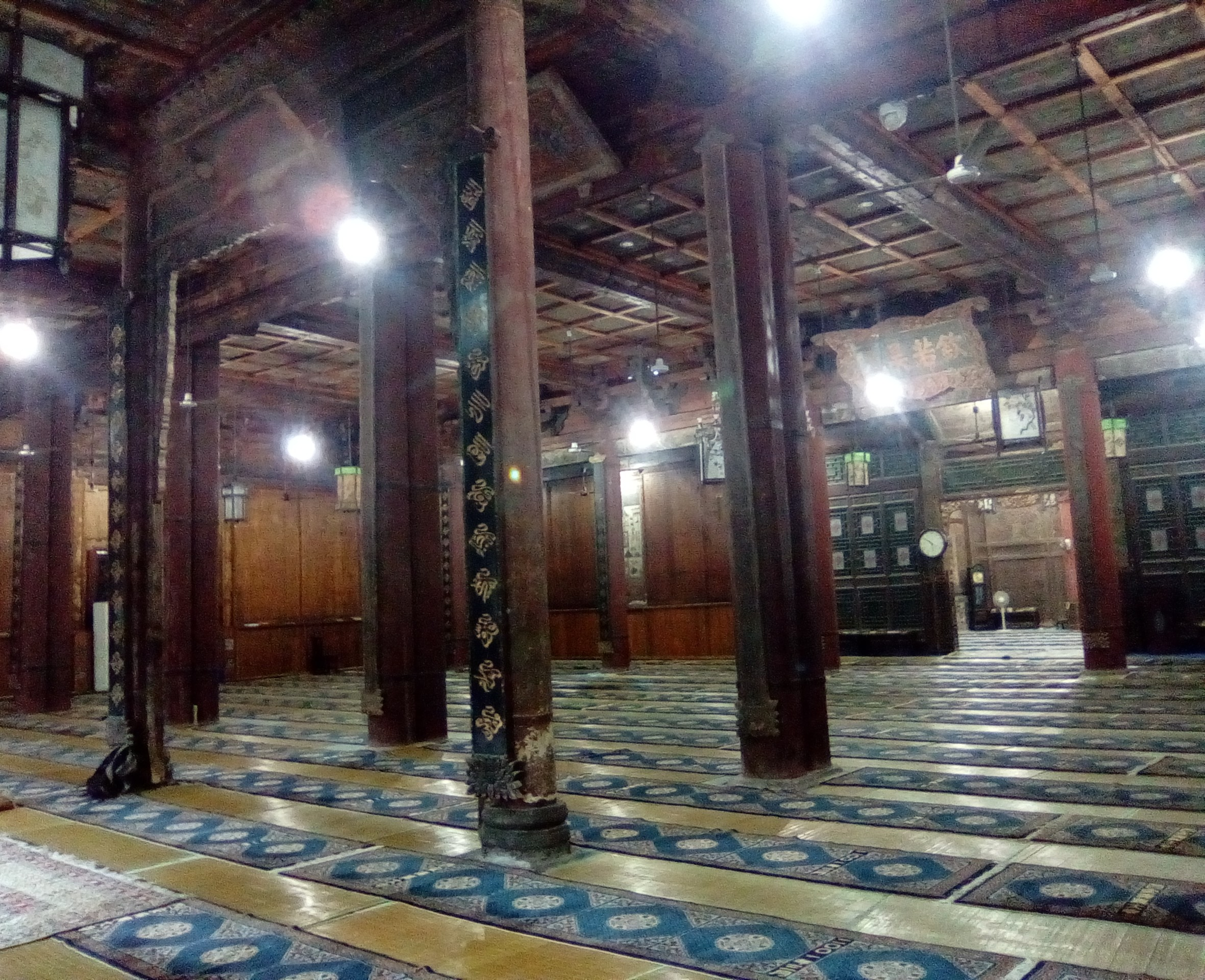
Prayer hall

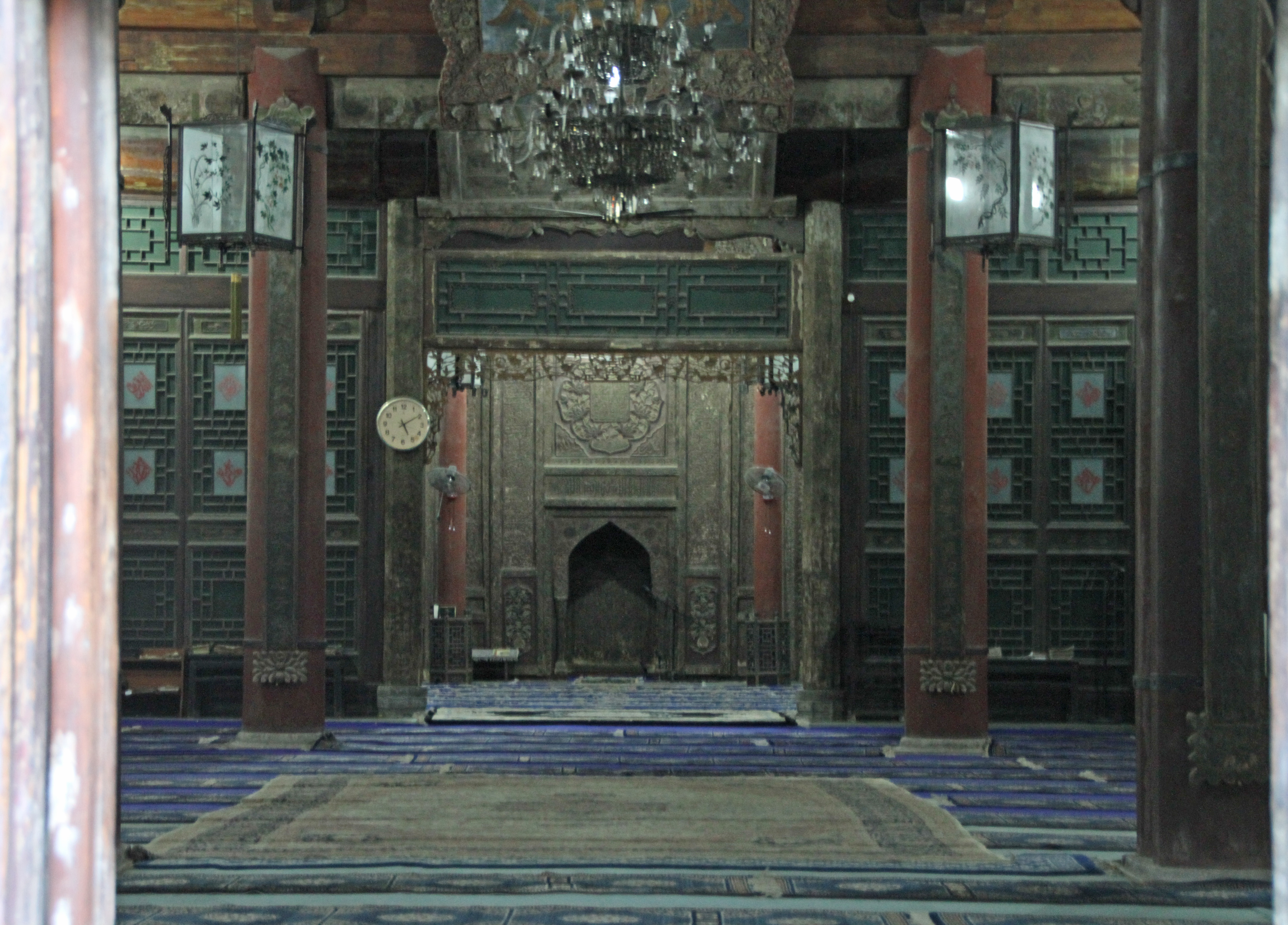
Prayer hall

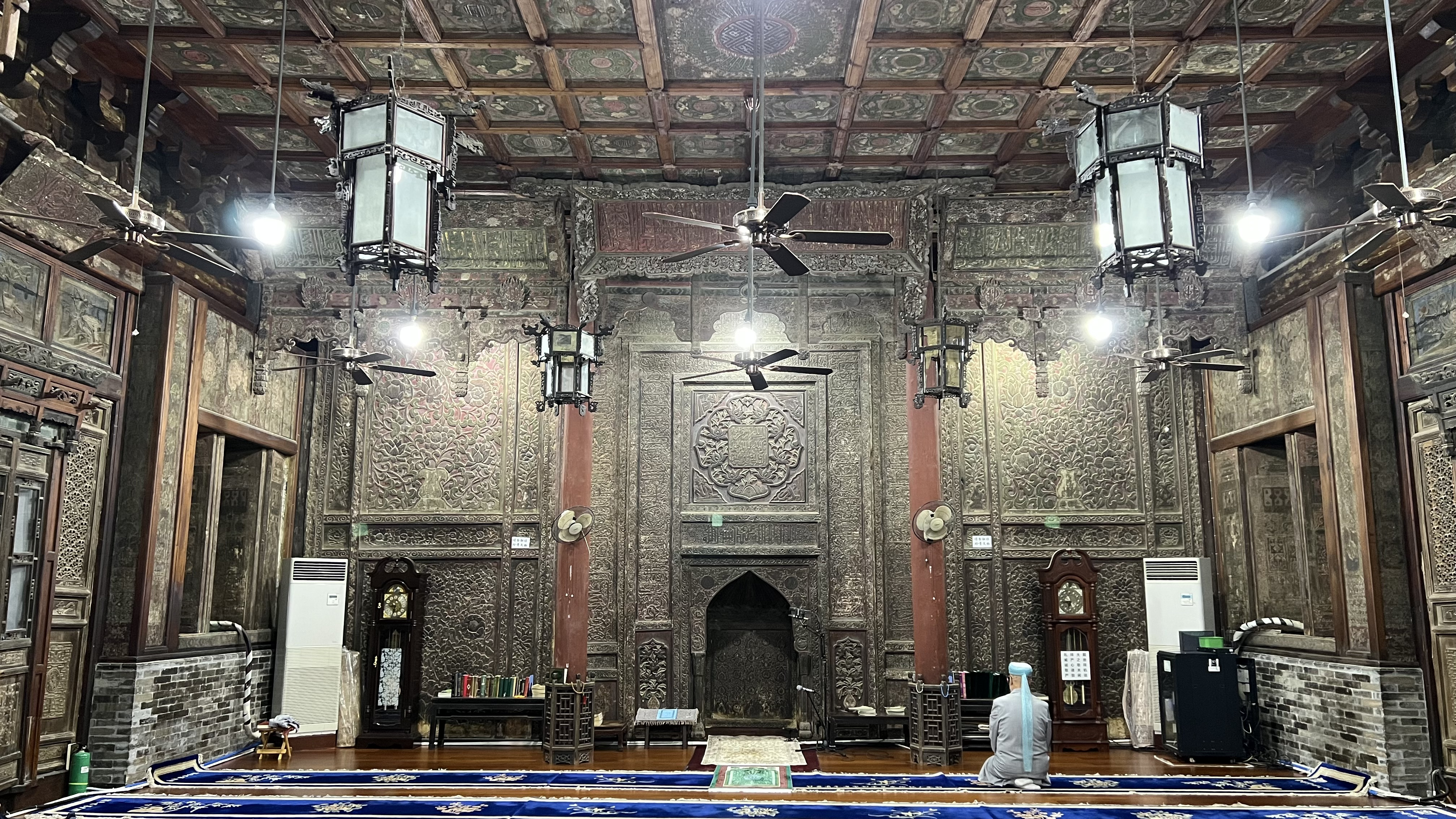
Main prayer hall with the Mihrab

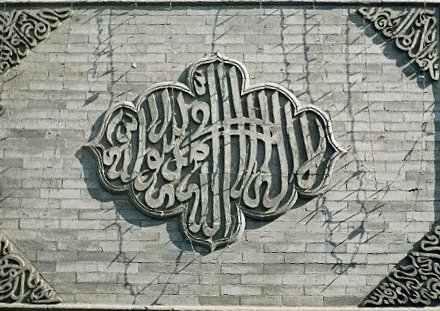
Calligraphy on a plaque in the mosque

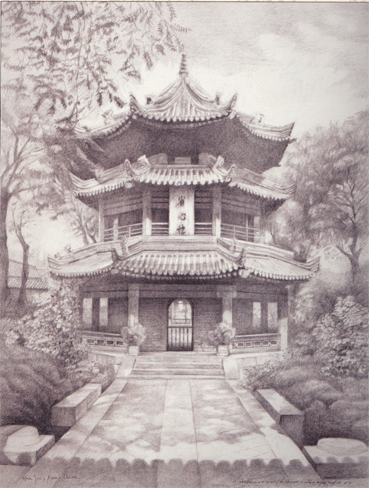
Wahbi Al-Hariri's graphite drawing of the minaret of the mosque

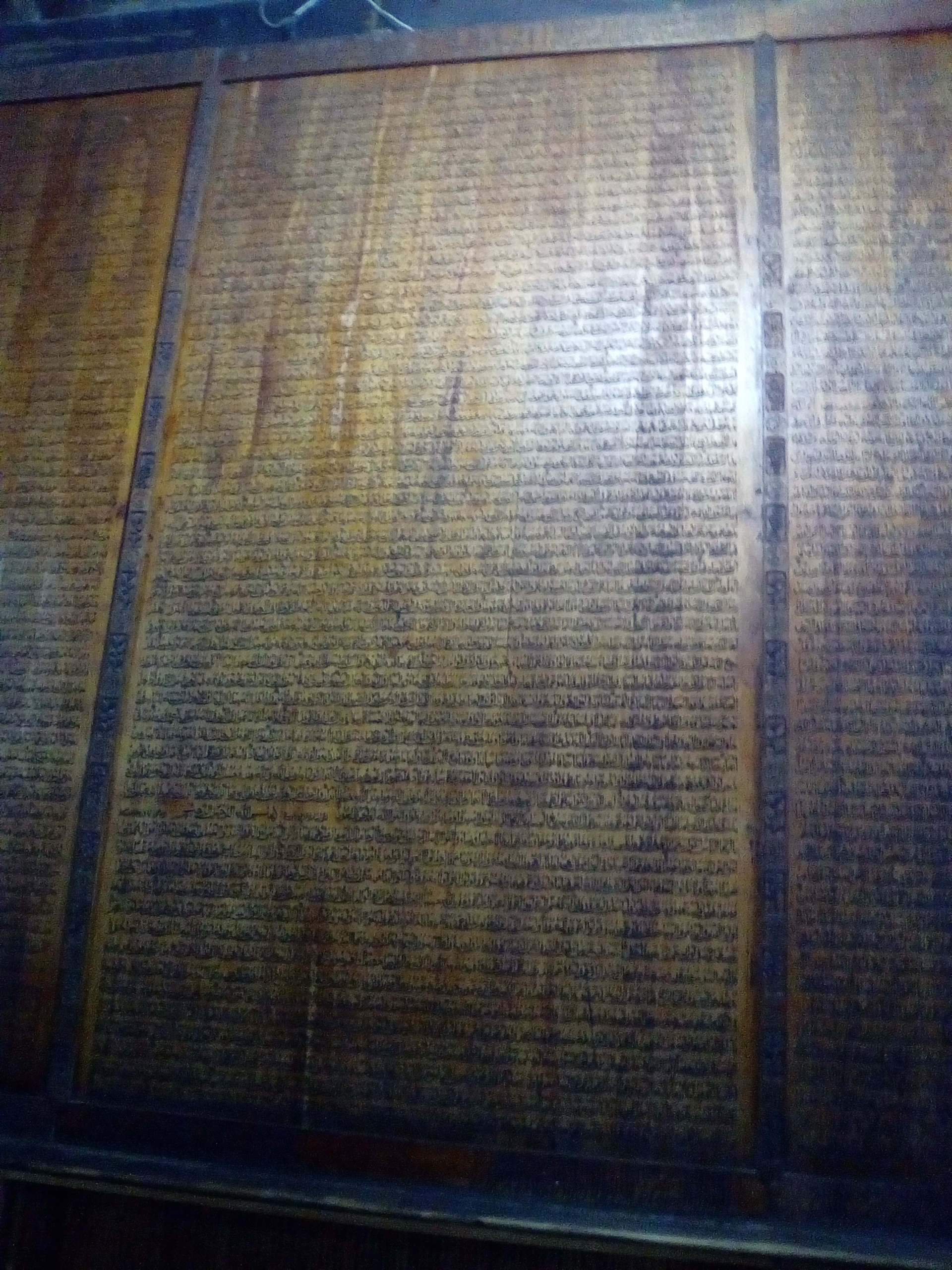
The Quran is engraved in Arabic and Chinese on the wall of the prayer hall

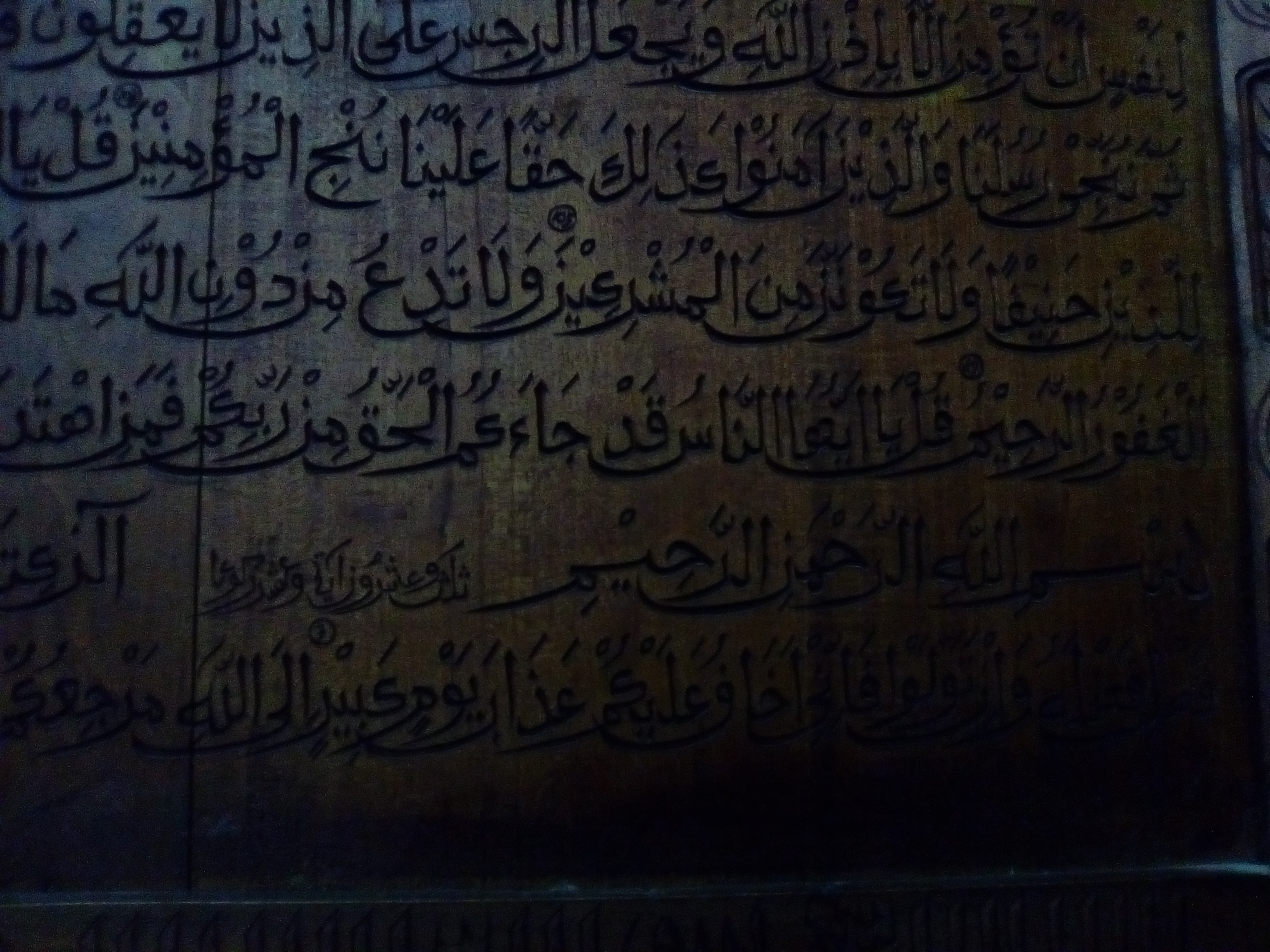
Arabic engraved Quran

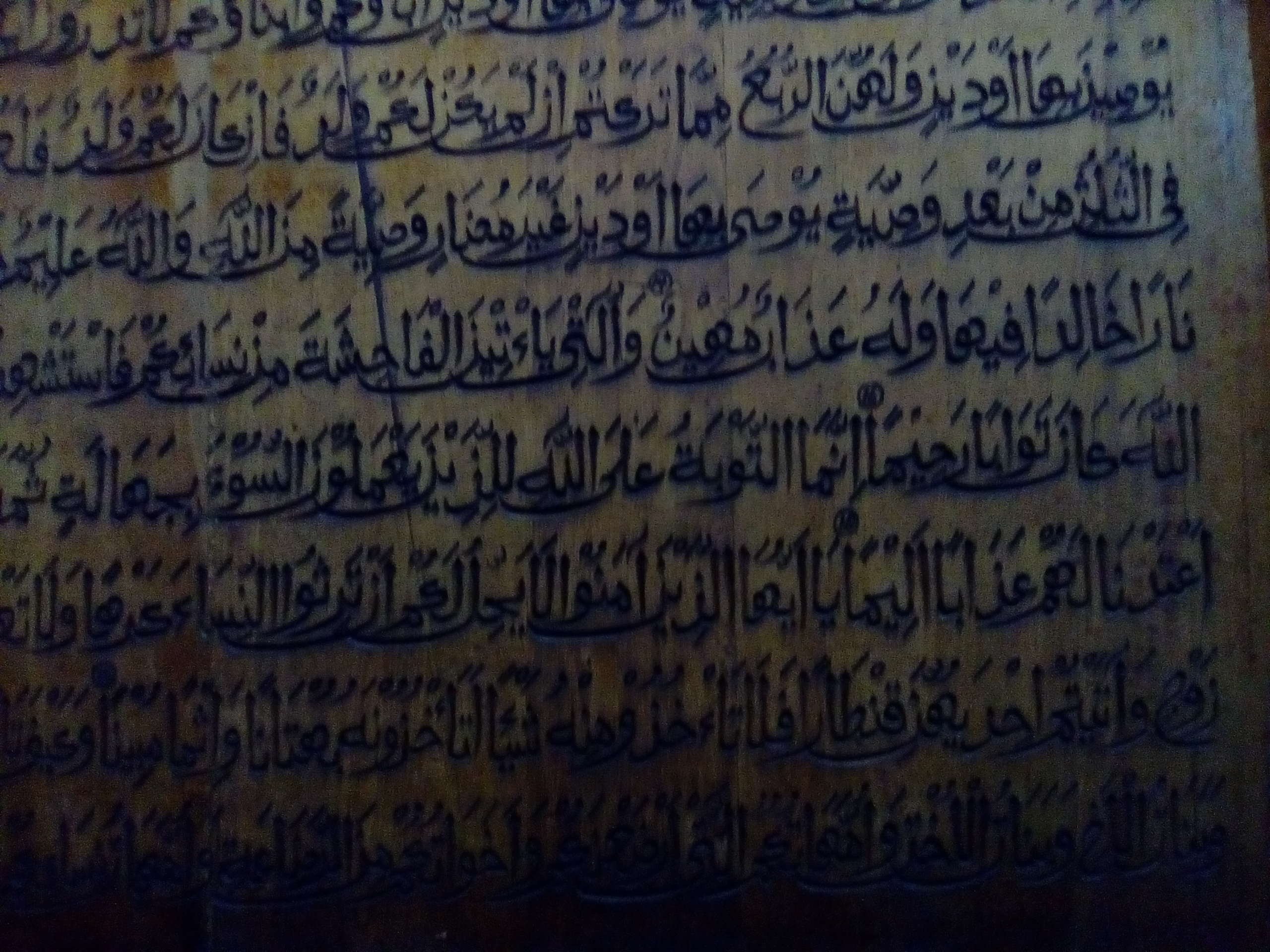
Arabic engraved Quran

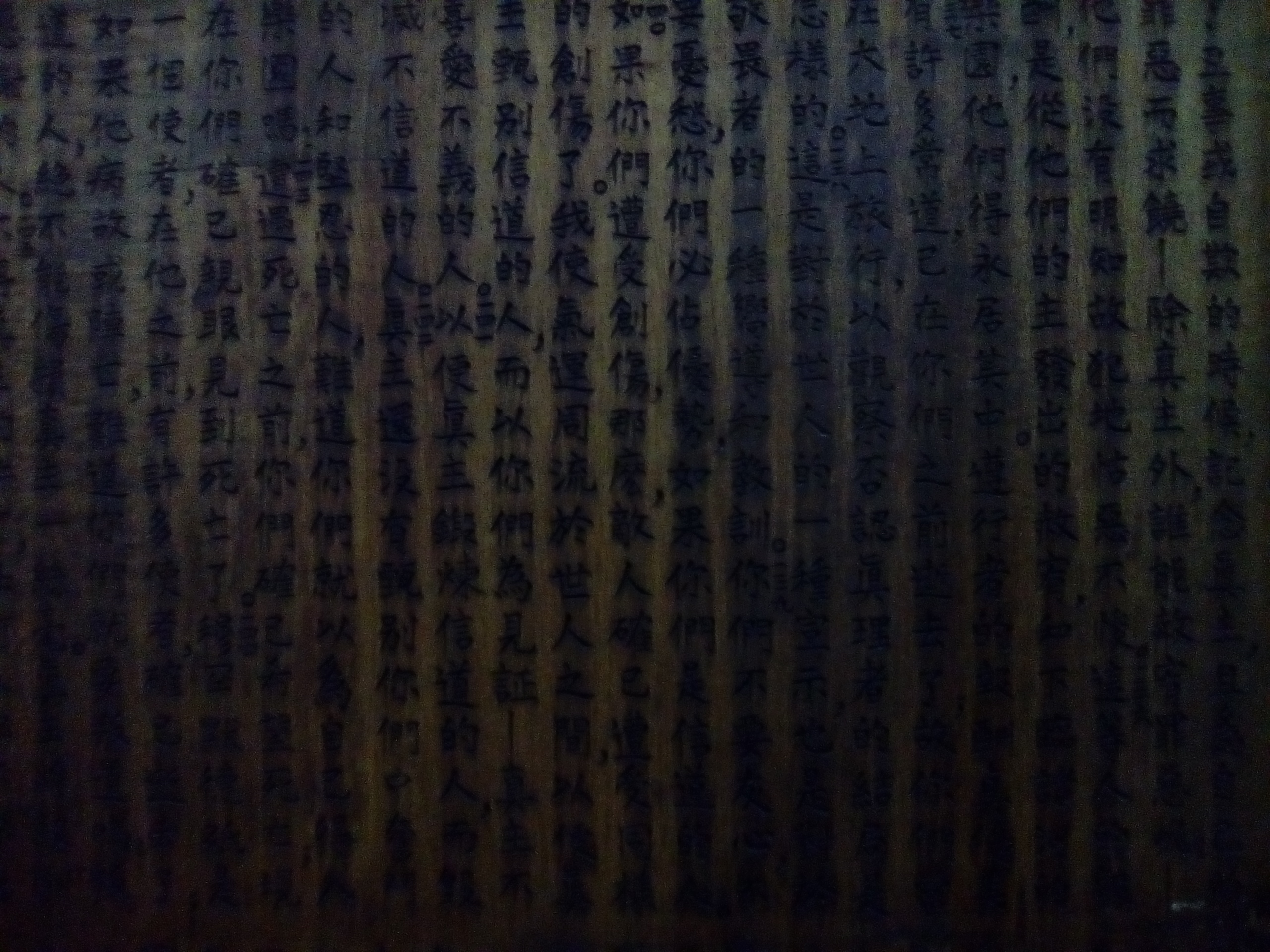
Chinese engraved Quran translation

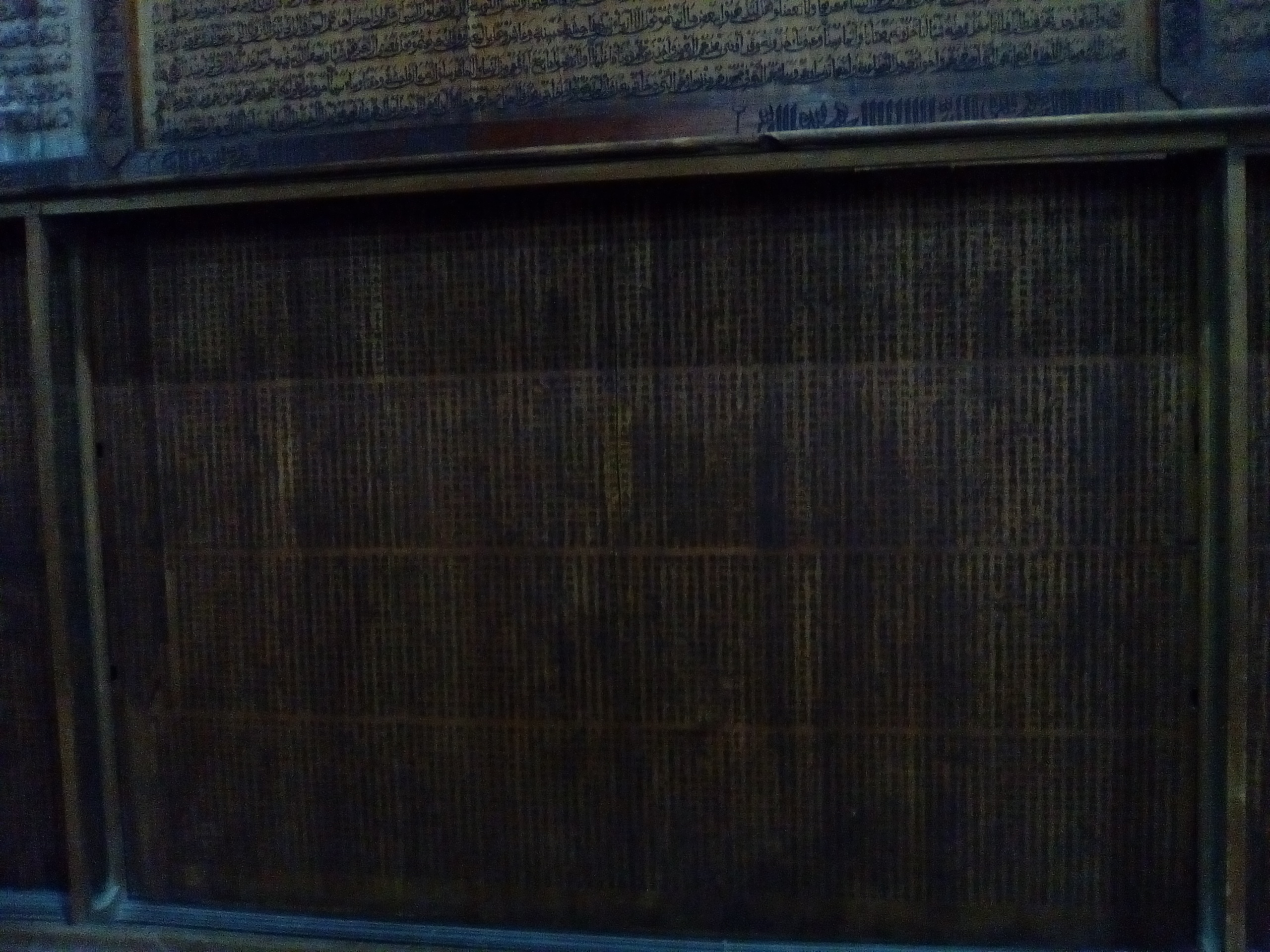
Chinese engraved Quran translation

== See also ==
- Islam in China
- List of the oldest mosques in the world
- List of mosques in China
- List of Major National Historical and Cultural Sites in Shaanxi
