= History of education in China =

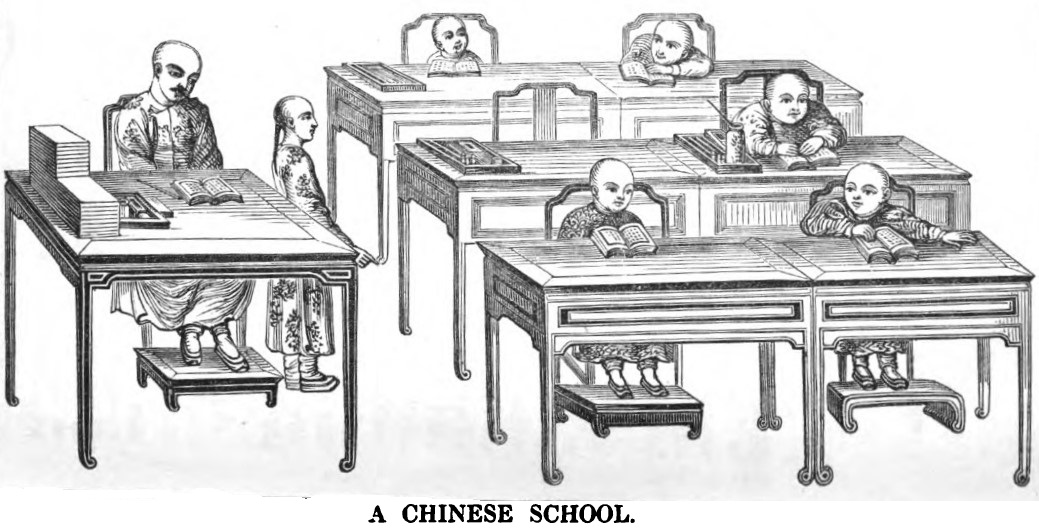
Education during the Qing dynasty (1847)

The history of education in China began with the birth of the Chinese civilization. Nobles often set up educational establishments for their offspring. Establishment of the imperial examinations (advocated in the Warring States period, originated in Han, founded in Tang) was instrumental in the transition from an aristocratic to a meritocratic government. Education was also seen as a symbol of power; the educated often earned significantly greater incomes.

== Shang and Zhou dynasties ==
The first written mention of a "school" in China appears in the oracle bones of the Shang dynasty (from c. 1250 BCE), which constitute the first written records in China and the main historical record for that period. Used for divination, questions would be written on the bones before they were placed in a fire, and then the results printed on the bones. Several of these divinations contain questions about school: ‘Is it auspicious for the children to go on school? Will it rain on their way home?’ However, the oracle bones contain little information about the function or purpose of the schools.

By the Zhou dynasty, inscriptions from bronze vessels and the Book of Rites suggest that the Zhou kings founded schools for young aristocratic men to serve the king. The Book of Rites suggests that most of these schools were located near ponds and forests, and therefore historians infer that these schools mostly focused on martial arts education, especially archery. From the Zhou period onwards, the imperial government would have a strong influence on the education system. The traditions from this period were passed on through the Book of Rites, which later became one of the Five Classics of the Confucian Canon. During the late Autumn and Spring period, such schools had become commonplace throughout the Zhou dynasty, but the power of the central government was slowly giving way to local warlords.

== The Warring States period ==
The Warring States period saw the rise of several influential philosophies, including Confucianism, Mohism, and Daoism. Of these philosophies, Confucianism would have the most long-term impact on state and imperial education.

The weakening of the Zhou empire and the rise of local warlords ushered in the Period of Warring States. Some local warlords may have founded academies to consolidate their power and gain legitimacy. The different schools were often organized into political entities to gain social influence. Rival scholars were invited to courts; governmental sponsorship led to the development of the first Chinese academies. Importance of education and respect to the teachers was stressed in the Annals of Lü Buwei.

One educational institution that existed during this period was the Jixia Academy. The open and tolerant atmosphere in this academy attracted Confucian and Daoist scholars from across the country for debate and study. However, the institution had no long-term impact on subsequent Chinese institutions.

== Han era ==
Emperor Wu of Han favored Confucianism and made it as the national educational doctrine. In 124 BC, The Origins of Statecraft in China was set up to turn out civil servants for the state, which taught the Five Classics of Confucianism. The traditional Chinese attitude towards education followed Mencius's advice that "Those who labor with their minds govern others; those who labor with their strength are governed by others."

Beginning during the Han dynasty, the state promoted the written language through state schools. State schools were also complemented by private schools and academies which lineage groups sponsored.

== The Sui and Tang dynasty ==
In the Sui dynasty (581–619), the imperial examination system was established to train and recruit Confucian scholar-officials. Especially in the Song dynasty (960–1279), the imperial examination become the most fundamental and important ancient Chinese political and educational system. The function of a professional bureaucracy in ancient Chinese higher education served the imperial examination system.

== Medieval period ==
The Imperial examination began in 605, which required students to pass their local minimum score before the final examination in the capital. So the private school prevailed. White Deer Grotto Academy and Donglin Academy were their models. Meanwhile, the art school Pear Garden appeared in the early 8th century, and in 1178 a national military school was set up.

The invention of paper and movable type greatly aided the education system.

== Qing dynasty ==
Education during the Qing dynasty was dominated by provincial academies, which did not charge tuition fees and gave stipends to preselected students. They were dedicated to the pursuit of independent study of the classics and literature, rather than to the preparation for governance, as was the case with imperial academies. Professors rarely lectured students, instead offering advice and critiquing research.

The near total neglect of engineering, mathematics, and other applied science education by the state contributed to a vast gap in military power between China and the European empires, as evidenced by the outcomes of the First and Second Opium Wars and the Sino–French War amongst others. In response, the Qing embarked on a self-strengthening movement, founding the Tongwen Guan in 1861, which hired foreign teachers to teach European languages, mathematics, astronomy and chemistry.

In 1872, the Qing dynasty sent 120 students to study in the United States. It was China's first Educational Mission.

After Qing was defeated by Japan during the first Sino-Japanese War, Peiyang University (or Imperial Tientsin University), the first modern university in China was established in 1895, of which the undergraduate education system was fully based on the counterpart in USA. In 1898, Peking University was founded, with a curriculum based on the Japanese system. In 1905, the imperial examinations were abolished. In 1908, American President Theodore Roosevelt established the Boxer Indemnity Scholarship Program, which diverted funds from the Boxer Indemnity toward higher education inside China, as well as for Chinese students to study in the United States. Tsinghua University was founded in 1911 by its provisions.

Japan's education was seen as an interesting model for modernization because an emperor's authority was not questioned, and Confucian hierarchy was maintained. From 1902 to 1908 the central government sent 64 officials, while provincial governments sent an additional 619 persons, in order to learn about education in Japan.

== Modern era ==
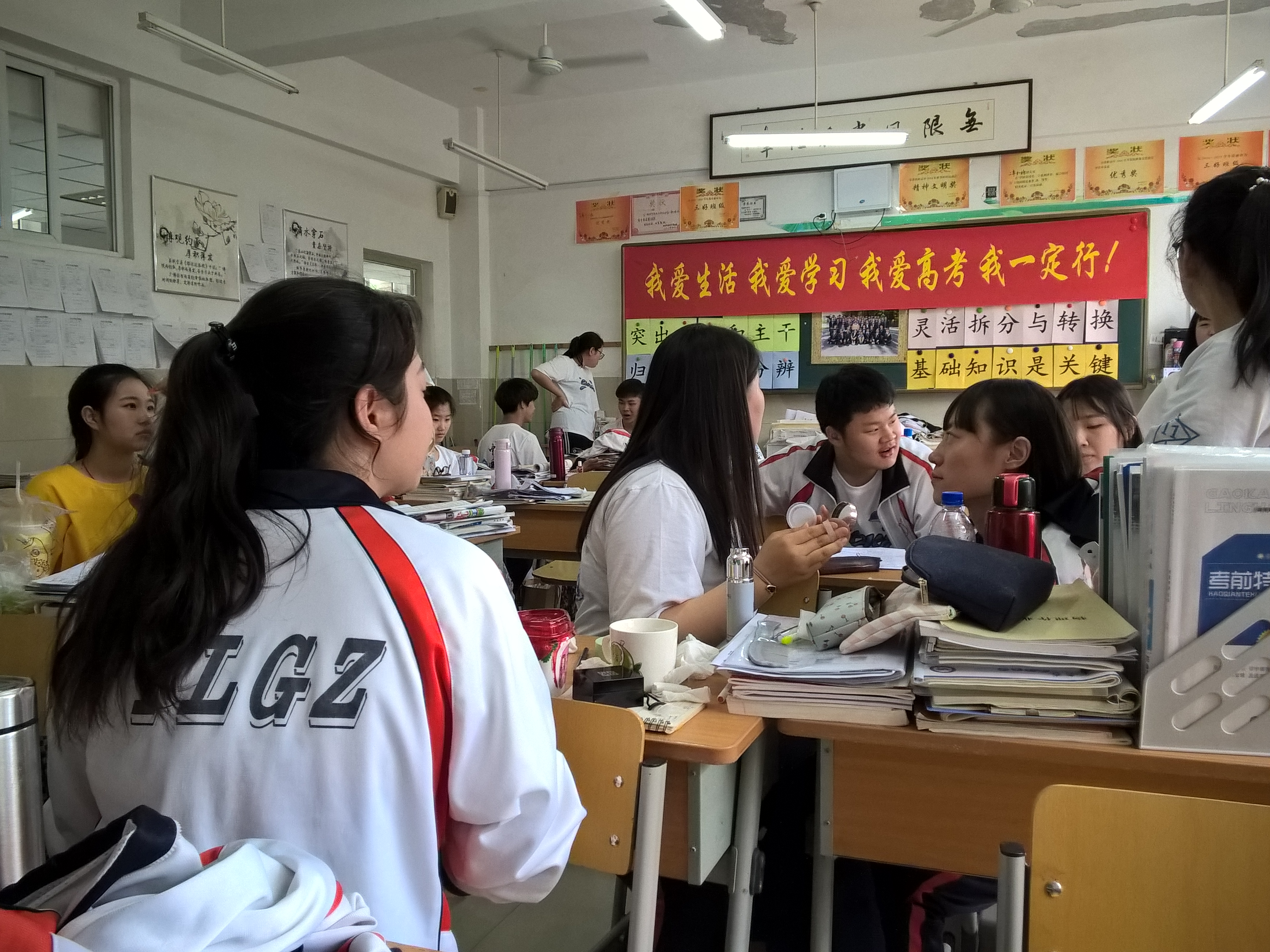
Students in Tieling, Liaoning

=== Republic of China ===
The replacement of the Qing dynasty by the Republic of China increased the power of urban elites who sought to modernize the country, including through state education.

The New Culture Movement of 1919 was a reaction against the Chinese government's emphasis on technical knowledge, and resulted in a new enthusiasm for theoretical knowledge, but with a focus on Western philosophy rather than Confucianism. Education was mostly decentralized in this period, since China was politically disunited, with Chinese warlords and foreign imperialists, especially the Japanese, occupying significant chunks of Chinese territory.

Early advocates of Catholic education in China included Ma Xiangbo and Ying Lianzhi.Among their efforts to promote Catholic education were Ma's donations to help found Zhendan Academy (Aurora University) and their efforts between 1912 and 1917 to persuade the Holy See to open a Catholic University in the capital, which occurred when the Catholic University of Peking opened in 1925.

In the late 1920s, the Republic of China government implemented the Restore Educational Rights Movement, which sought to raise a nationally-conscious populace by emphasizing that education should serve the interests of Chinese students and society, not those of foreign countries or religions.

During the Second Sino-Japanese War, the Japanese targeted Chinese universities, which they viewed as a source of Chinese culture. For example, Japanese military police (Kempeitai) sealed off Yenching University's campus and also arrested its foreign faculty.

Both the Chinese Communist Party (CCP) and the Nationalists deemed education important for resisting the Japanese and building the Chinese nation. In Communist-governed areas, the CCP operated schools, night schools, and offered literacy classes. It established schools in Yan'an to develop Party cadres, including the Central Party School, the Counter-Japanese Military and Political University, the Chinese Women's University, and Lu Xun Art College.

=== People's Republic of China ===
During the Chinese Civil War, the Chinese Communist Party improved education in areas it controlled. It opened schools for adults and children (both male and female) in which locally produced textbooks were used and led literacy campaigns. These efforts marked the first time in Chinese history that peasants had educational opportunities. During the Mao era, education for all and literacy campaigns were major focuses.

In April 1933, the Communist Party's provisional government issued education policy guidelines directed party committees at all levels to focus on cultural education and increasing the class consciousness of workers and peasants. Because literacy in China had historically been connected with political power, public education and literacy campaigns were viewed as inherently revolutionary.

After the success of the Chinese Communist Revolution and the founding of the People's Republic of China in 1949, the CCP brought the educational system under national control. Improving population-wide literacy was the focus of education in the early years of the PRC. In 1949, the literacy rate was only between 20 and 40%. The government focused on improving literacy through both formal schooling and literacy campaigns. The Communist Party began large-scale expansion of public education. In the first sixteen years of the PRC, elementary school enrollment tripled, secondary school enrollment increased by a factor of 8.5, and college enrollment more than quadrupled. By 1979, participation by Chinese youth in primary school was nearly universal.

The Chinese Academy of Sciences was set up in 1949.

History was a major subject of educational emphasis during the 1950s, including because of the belief that it would help the development of a national identity in the PRC.

During the period of the First Five Year Plan, the State Planning Commission set the number of university enrollment spaces. Beginning in the 1950s and running through the 1960s, university graduates were provided with jobs via state allocation.

In 1951, China adopted the Resolution on the Educational System Reform. It made cadre and adult training schools an integral part of the school system, replaced bilevel elementary school (which leadership believed impeded the education of working class children) with five year elementary school, and increased specialized technological education at the secondary school level and in colleges.

The PRC nationalized or dismantled various American-operated universities. U.S.-style universities for elites were re-organized into Soviet-style institutions for peasants and workers, with a greater focus on practical skills than theoretical knowledge. As China adopted the Soviet educational model, it reduced the number of comprehensive universities but significantly increased the number of specialized practical or technical institutions. As part of this process of re-organization, the formerly American-affiliated higher educational institutions were divided among, and absorbed by, other colleges and universities.

Per the 1949-1954 Common Program, Chinese students were required to participate in a nationwide study movement on political history and concepts, including new democracy.

In 1952, the Ministry of Education sought to develop a system of political counselors as a pilot program in universities. Tsinghua University established a political counselor program in 1953, becoming the first university to do so. In this program, new graduates who were also CCP members worked as political counselors in managing the student body and student organizations, often simultaneously serving as Communist Youth League secretaries.

In the late 1950s, language reform by way of simplified Chinese characters were introduced into schools, as well as in publications like newspapers. This language reform was intended to make reading easier and thereby increase literacy.

During the Great Leap Forward, the number of universities in China increased to 1,289 by 1960 and nationwide enrollment more than doubled to 962,000 in 1960. Educational reforms during the Great Leap Forward emphasized student discussion and learning from members of the community and downplayed the role of memorization and textbooks. The Communist Party encouraged teachers to bring workers, peasants, and soldiers into the classroom to directly share experiences with the students. Educational reforms also sought to increase student and staff participation in the administration process, to favor students from worker, peasant, or soldier backgrounds in admissions, and to increase the role of the Communist Party and of politics in schools. Beginning in 1961, universities rolled back these policy initiatives, and increase meritocratic university policies instead of egalitarian ones.

In 1962, Zhou Enlai directed schools to strengthen foreign language education. In July of that year, the Ministry of Education required that foreign languages (primarily English) be taught at the older grades of elementary schools. The next year, the Ministry required all schools and universities to further increase the number of English classes and to increase efforts to identify English language talent.

In the 1960s, Mao Zedong viewed the Chinese education system as hampered by a formalism that wasted young people's talents. By 1964, he argued that school curricula, which had been copied closely from the Soviet model of the 1950s, should be reformed. Mao proposed reducing the number of school years so that teaching could be combined with activities in fields like agriculture, industry, military service, and politics. Mao argued that these changes would overcome the limits of specialization and established social hierarchies.

Beginning in 1965, the Third Front campaign to develop basic industry and national defense industry in China's hinterlands also resulted in urban educational standards and pedagogy being brought to the countryside.

Larger danwei might have schools on their premises.

==== Cultural Revolution ====
The early stages of the Cultural Revolution disrupted education, which became one of the most contested socio-political matters. In June 1966, the national university entrance examinations were suspended. With the disruption in education, the secondary school classes of 1966, 1967, and 1968 which were unable to graduate on time later became known as the Old three cohort. Alongside a break in the direct progression from high school to college, the rural education system was expanded and rural high school graduates were expected to later return to their villages to contribute to rural development. Languages of ethnic minorities in China were labeled as part of the Four Olds, texts in minority languages were burned, and bilingual education was suppressed.

Based on a July 1968 comment by Mao Zedong, July 21st Industrial Universities were established at factories as part-time technical and engineering study programs. Mao had given the instruction to emulate the model of the Shanghai Machine Tool Factory university. Mao stated that short-term vocational courses should be created for current industrial workers. Factories around the country therefore established their own educational programs for technicians and engineers. By 1976, there were 15,000 July 21 Universities.

Cultural Revolution reformers wanted students to develop critical thinking, industrial skills, and farming skills, while still retaining a focus on academics. When schools re-opened in the early 1970s, the worker, peasant, soldier student was viewed as the main student constituency. Curriculum was revised with a focus on practical education and abstract learning and "bookishness" were condemned. Classroom education included only a fraction of the school day and the balance was spent in practical training. The precise mix of academic work and physical work varied by time and location.

In the early stages of the Cultural Revolution, shiying kebei (trial textbooks) heavily weighted towards practical knowledge such as operating machinery or pumps proliferated. By 1971, these textbooks had achieved a greater balance between practical knowledge and more traditional academic subjects.From 1973 to 1975, the practice of kaimen banxue (running an open school) was encouraged. Each week, students would have one afternoon of routine physical labor, students could go spend a month to learn a skill of their choosing at a factory, hospital, or the like.

Foreign language schools resumed in the early 1970s. Among their tasks was to work with peasants and workers revise foreign language dictionaries, eliminating aspects that were deemed "serious capitalist perspectives."

Until the 1975 restoration of the Ministry of Education, the State Council's Science and Education Group was the most important government body in the education bureaucracy.

==== Hua Guofeng ====
Beginning in 1977 during the Hua Guofeng era, the college entrance exam system was reintroduced. Its reintroduction decreased educational opportunities for the highly motivated, but not academically prepared, peasants who had benefited from the "worker, peasant, soldier" model of the later stage of the Cultural Revolution. Rusticated youths surged to take the examinations, eager to pick up the studies they had left off during the chaotic Cultural Revolution period. This included an older generation of students resuming their studies. Children from Third Front work units received preference on the new exam.

Vocational and practical training at the university level was greatly decreased in favor of research. Fewer rural people returned to their villages after completing their university studies.

==== Deng Xiaoping ====
During Reform and Opening Up, a "beacon school" system was created to identifiy and train primary and secondary school students for university education. Students for the beacon schools were selected solely on the basis of their exam results.

Deng endorsed the political counselor program in universities, which had been piloted by Tsinghua University before the Cultural Revolution and which had resumed in 1977. After its endorsement by Deng, the program expanded across higher educational institutions.

Beginning in the 1980s, Hanyu pinyin became important in early education, with students learning it in tandem with, or even before, learning Chinese characters themselves.

==== 1990s and early 2000s ====
In 1990, less than 2% of China's adult population had college degrees. Since 2000, higher education has experienced a boom in China, with many universities and colleges being built in periurban areas. By 2015, more than 15% of adults had college degrees. The growth in college educational opportunities has been particularly large for those born in the 1980s. As of 2020, 54% of China's college-aged population was enrolled in college.

In 1991, the CCP launched the nationwide Patriotic Education Campaign. The major focus of the campaign was within education, and text books were revised to reduce narratives of class struggle and to emphasize the party's role in ending the century of humiliation.As part of the campaign, Patriotic Education Bases were established, and schools ranging from primary to the college levels were required to take students to sites of significance to the Chinese Communist Revolution. In history education, the Patriotic Education Campaign highlighted Japanese atrocities against China during the Second Sino-Japanese War.

Women's educational attainment grew considerably. By 2009 half of all college students were women. China's rate of increase in women's higher education levels has been substantially greater than countries with similar, and some countries with higher, per capita income levels.

Since the 1990s the Soviet model has been largely abolished in China, with many universities expanding or merging with others to provide more comprehensive education in parallel with specialized technical training. Also beginning in the 1990s, the political counselor system was further institutionalized and expanded in higher educational institutions throughout China, with standardized rules such as term limits and age limits being issued by the Ministry of Education in 2000.

In the late 1990s, China launched Project 211, aiming to strengthen educational offerings at 100 leading universities. China also implemented Project 985, which was designed to support 39 elite universities.

In 2003, China's Ministry of Education called for adding environmental education content throughout the public school curriculum from the first year of primary school through the second year of high school.

Following the launch of the Free Lunch Project by a grassroots non-governmental organization, in 2011 China's central government established the National Nutrition Subsidies Policy to provide 16 billion yuan (US$2.32 billion) per year for rural students.

==== Xi Jinping ====
In 2014, the General Office of the Chinese Communist Party and State Council of the People's Republic of China issued guidance on strengthening ideological education in colleges and universities. During Xi Jinping's tenure, numerous colleges and universities have established schools of Marxism. In 2012, there were about a hundred such schools nationwide; as of 2021, there were more than 1,440. Master's degree and Doctoral programs in Marxism have increased significantly since 2016. In 2017, Chinese universities and regional governments began establishing centers for the study of Xi Jinping Thought on ecological civilization. At least 18 such centers had been established as of 2021.

In 2021, the government shutdown private tutoring for schoolchildren based on the rationale that rising educational costs were antithetical to the goals of common prosperity.

Xi has also implemented a number of other education reforms. Schools are required to adjust their opening hours to be consistent with work hours in their area so that parents can pick-up their children directly after work (in order to reduce reliance on private classes for adult supervision after school hours). Schools must also promote health by requiring outdoor physical education classes daily and providing eye examinations twice per term. Private Tibetan schools have been closed and many Tibetans children attend mandatory state boarding schools.

As part of Xi's 2021 directive on "double lessening" (reducing excessive off-campus tutoring and reducing homework burdens), schools may not assign homework to children to grades one and two, homework is limited to no more than 60 minutes for children in grades three to six, and no more than 90 minutes for middle school children.

In 2021, the government shutdown private tutoring for schoolchildren based on the rationale that rising educational costs were antithetical to the goals of common prosperity. Shutting down private tutoring was intended to narrow the education gap between rich and poor. Rules issued in July 2021 prohibits new registration of private tuition tutoring centers and required existing centers to re-organize as non-profits. Tuition centers are prohibited from being listed on the stock market or receiving "excessive capital." They are no longer permitted to offer tutoring on the weekends or during public holidays.

Since September 2021, private schools providing compulsory education can no longer be controlled by foreign entities or individuals. Only Chinese nationals may serve on their Boards of Directors. In 2024, Chinese state media began urging higher education institutions to promote "love education" to boost the country's fertility rate.

== Islamic education ==
Jingtang Jiaoyu was a form of Islamic education developed during the Ming dynasty among the Hui, centered around Mosques. The Arabic and Persian language Thirteen Classics were part of the main curriculum. In the madrassas, some Chinese Muslim literature like the Han Kitab were used for educational purposes. Liu Zhi (scholar) wrote texts to help Hui learn Arabic. Persian was the main Islamic foreign language used by Chinese Muslims, followed by Arabic.

Jingtang Jiaoyu was founded during the era of Hu Dengzhou 1522–1597. There were 5 Persian books and the Qur'an was among 8 Arabic books which made up the "Thirteen Classics" (سابقة).

The Chinese Muslim Arabic writing scholars Ma Lianyuan 馬聯元 1841–1903 was trained by Ma Fuchu 馬复初 1794–1874 in Yunnan with Ma Lianyuan writing books on law 'Umdat al-'Islām (عمدة الإسلام) شىي ش grammar book on ṣarf (صرف) called Hawā and Ma Fuchu writing a grammar book on naḥw (نحو) called Muttasiq (متسق) and Kāfiya (كافية). Šarḥ al-laṭā'if (شرح اللطائف) Liu Zhi's The Philosophy of Arabia 天方性理 (Tianfang Xingli) Arabic translation by (Muḥammad Nūr al-Ḥaqq ibn Luqmān as-Ṣīnī) (محمد نور الحق إبن لقمان الصيني), the Arabic name of Ma Lianyuan. Islamic names, du'ā' (دُعَاء), ġusl (غسل), prayers, and other ceremonies were taught in the Miscellaneous studies (Zaxue) 雜學 while 'āyāt (آيات) from the Qur'an were taught in the Xatm al-Qur'an (ختم القرآن) (Haiting). Ma Fuchu brought an Arabic Qasidat (Gesuide jizhu 格随德集注) poem to China.

Hui Muslim generals like Ma Fuxiang, Ma Hongkui, and Ma Bufang funded schools or sponsored students studying abroad. Imam Hu Songshan and Ma Linyi were involved in reforming Islamic education inside China.

Muslim Kuomintang officials in the Republic of China government supported the Chengda Teachers Academy, which helped usher in a new era of Islamic education in China, promoting nationalism and Chinese language among Muslims, and fully incorporating them into the main aspects of Chinese society. The Ministry of Education provided funds to the Chinese Islamic National Salvation Federation for Chinese Muslim's education. The president of the federation was General Bai Chongxi (Pai Chung-hsi) and the vice president was Tang Kesan (Tang Ko-san). 40 Sino-Arabic primary schools were founded in Ningxia by its Governor Ma Hongkui.

Imam Wang Jingzhai studied at Al-Azhar University in Egypt along with several other Chinese Muslim students, the first Chinese students in modern times to study in the Middle East. Wang recalled his experience teaching at madrassas in the provinces of Henan (Yu), Hebei (Ji), and Shandong (Lu) which were outside of the traditional stronghold of Muslim education in northwest China, and where the living conditions were poorer and the students had a much tougher time than the northwestern students. In 1931 China sent five students to study at Al-Azhar in Egypt, among them was Muhammad Ma Jian and they were the first Chinese to study at Al-Azhar. Na Zhong, a descendant of Nasr al-Din (Yunnan) was another one of the students sent to Al-Azhar in 1931, along with Zhang Ziren, Ma Jian, and Lin Zhongming.

Hui Muslims from the Central Plains (Zhongyuan) differed in their view of women's education than Hui Muslims from the northwestern provinces, with the Hui from the Central Plains provinces like Henan having a history of women's Mosques and religious schooling for women, while Hui women in northwestern provinces were kept in the house. However, in northwestern China reformers, such as Cai Yuanpei, started bringing female education in the 1920s. In Linxia, Gansu, a secular school for Hui girls was founded by the Muslim warlord Ma Bufang, the school was named Shuada Suqin Women's Primary School after his wife Ma Suqin who was also involved in its founding. Hui Muslim refugees fled to northwest China from the central plains after the Japanese invasion of China, where they continued to practice women's education and build women's mosque communities, while women's education was not adopted by the local northwestern Hui Muslims and the two different communities continued to differ in this practice.

General Ma Fuxiang donated funds to promote education for Hui Muslims and help build a class of intellectuals among the Hui and promote the Hui role in developing the nation's strength.

Since the 1980s Islamic private schools (Sino-Arabic schools (中阿學校)) have been supported and permitted by the Chinese government in Muslim areas outside Xinjiang.

=== Xi Jinping general secretaryship ===
Although religious education for children is officially forbidden by law in China, the CCP allows Hui Muslims to violate this law and have their children educated in religion and attend Mosques while the law is enforced on Uyghurs. In Uyghur communities, Islamic education for children has been prohibited and teaching the Quran to children has resulted in criminal prosecution. After secondary education is completed, China then allows Hui students who are willing to embark on religious studies under an Imam. China does not enforce the law against children attending Mosques on non-Uyghurs in areas outside of Xinjiang.

== See also ==
- Academies (China)
  - Yuelu Academy
  - White Deer Grotto Academy
- Guozijian (Imperial Academies)
- Hanlin Academy
- Boxer Indemnity Scholarship Program
- Imperial examination
- Imperial examination in Chinese mythology
- Education in the People's Republic of China

== Bibliography ==
=== General Studies ===
- Suzanne Pepper, Radicalism and Education Reform in 20th-Century China: The Search for an Ideal Development Model (Cambridge; New York: Cambridge University Press, 1996). History of social and political reform using schools.
- John F. Cleverley, The Schooling of China: Tradition and Modernity in Chinese Education (North Sydney, NSW, Australia: Allen & Unwin; 2nd, 1991)

=== Traditional China ===
- Benjamin A. Elman, Alexander Woodside, eds., Education and Society in Late Imperial China, 1600–1900 (Berkeley: University of California Press, 1994). Scholarly articles.
- Thomas H. C. Lee, Education in Traditional China: A History (Leiden; Boston: Brill, 2000) Google Books view on WorldCat ISBN 90-04-10363-5.
- Evelyn Sakakida Rawski, Education and Popular Literacy in Ch'ing China (Ann Arbor: University of Michigan Press, 1979). Shows that rates of literacy in the Qing dynasty were far higher than had been thought.
- Zurndorfer, Harriet T.. 1992. “Learning, Lineages, and Locality in Late Imperial China. A Comparative Study of Education in Huichow (anhwei) and Foochow (fukien) 1600–1800. Part II”. Journal of the Economic and Social History of the Orient 35 (3). BRILL: 209–38. doi:10.2307/3632732.

=== Modernization and Westernization, 1860–1949 ===
- Chaudhary, Latika, Aldo Musacchio, Steven Nafziger, and Se Yan. "Big BRICs, weak foundations: The beginning of public elementary education in Brazil, Russia, India, and China." Explorations in Economic History 49, no. 2 (2012): 221–240. online
- Hayford, Charles W. "Literacy Movements in Modern China," in Harvey Graff and Robert Arnove, ed., Literacy Movements in Historical Perspective (New York; London, 1987), 147–171
- Hayhoe, Ruth, Marianne Bastid, China's Education and the Industrialized World: Studies in Cultural Transfer (Armonk, N.Y.: M.E. Sharpe, 1987).
- Hayhoe, Ruth. Education and Modernization: The Chinese Experience (Oxford; New York: Pergamon Press; 1st, 1992)
- Hayhoe, Ruth (1995). China's Universities, 1895–1995: A Century of Cultural Conflict. Routledge. ISBN 1-135-58214-9.
- Lutz, Jessie Gregory. China and the Christian Colleges, 1850-1950 (Ithaca,: Cornell University Press, 1971). The growth and influence of thirteen colleges founded by Protestant missionaries.
- Pepper, Suzanne. Radicalism and Education Reform in 20th-Century China: The Search for an Ideal Development Model (Cambridge; New York: Cambridge University Press, 1996)
- Riordan, James and Robin Jones. Sport and Physical Education in China (London; New York: E & FN Spon, 1999).

=== Educational Exchange ===
- Cheng Li, Bridging Minds across the Pacific: U.S.-China Educational Exchanges, 1978–2003 (Lanham, Md.: Lexington Books, 2005)
- Hongshan Li, U.S. – China Educational Exchange: State, Society, and Intercultural Relations, 1905-1950 (Piscataway: Rutgers University Press, 2007).
- Edward J.M. Rhoads, Stepping Forth into the World the Chinese Educational Mission to the United States, 1872–81. (Hong Kong: Hong Kong Univ Pr, 2011). In depth study of the Chinese Educational Mission led by Yung Wing.

Islamic

- Allès, Élisabeth; Chérif-Chebbi, LeÏla; Halfon, Constance-Hélène (2003). "Chinese Islam: Unity and Fragmentation" (PDF). Archives de sciences sociales des religions. 31 (1). Translated from the French by Anne Evans. Keston Institute: 7–35. doi:10.1080/0963749032000045837. ISSN 0963-7494. S2CID 144070358.
- Garnaut, Anthony. "Chinese Muslim literature" (PDF). Contemporary China Studies – School of Interdisciplinary Area Studies – University of Oxford. Contemporary China Studies. Archived from the original (PDF) on 2014-05-01.
- The Encyclopaedia of Islam. Contributor Sir H. A. R. Gibb. Brill Archive. 1954. ISBN 90-04-07164-4.

=== The People's Republic, 1949- ===
- Howard Gardner, To Open Minds: Chinese Clues to the Dilemma of Contemporary American Education (New York: Basic Books, 1989). The observations of a leading American educationist who visited China in the 1980s and ascribed the effectiveness of Chinese education to underlying cultural attitudes and political choices.
- Emily Hannum and Albert Par, eds.,. Education and Reform in China. London; New York: Routledge, Critical Asian Scholarship, 2007. xx, 282 p.p. ISBN 0-415-77095-5 Google Books view on WorldCat. Comprehensive collection of articles on finance and access under reform; schools, teachers, literacy, and educational quality under market reforms after the death of Mao in 1976.
- Shi Ming Hu Eli Seifman, eds. Toward a New World Outlook: A Documentary History of Education in the People's Republic of China, 1949–1976 (New York: AMS Press, 1976)
- Xiufang Wang. Education in China since 1976. Jefferson, N.C.: McFarland & Co., 2003. ISBN 0-7864-1394-8. ISBN 978-0-7864-1394-2. Google Books view on WorldCat
- Xiulan Zhang, ed.,. China's Education Development and Policy, 1978–2008. Leiden; Boston: Brill, Social Scientific Studies in Reform Era China, 2011. xix, 480 pp. ISBN 978-90-04-18815-0 Google Books view on WorldCat Translations of articles by specialists in the PRC on policy making; early childhood education; basic education; special education; vocational education; ethnic minority education; private education.
- Ruth Hayhoe, China's Universities and the Open Door (Armonk, N.Y.: M.E. Sharpe, 1989)
- Julia Kwong, Chinese Education in Transition: Prelude to the Cultural Revolution (Montreal: McGill-Queen's University Press, 1979)
- Heidi A. Ross, China Learns English: Language Teaching and Social Change in the People's Republic (New Haven: Yale University Press, 1993)
- Jonathan Unger, Education under Mao: Class and Competition in Canton Schools, 1960–1980 (New York: Columbia University Press, 1982)
- Jing Lin, Education in Post-Mao China (Westport, Conn.: Praeger, 1993)

Periodicals

- Chinese Education M.E. Sharpe. A journal of translations from Chinese sources.
