= Campaign to Suppress Bandits in Northwestern China =

1949 military campaign

- Part of Chinese Civil War
Date	November 1949 – July 1953
Location	China
Result	Communist victory

Belligerents
National Revolutionary Army	People's Liberation Army

Commanders and leaders
Various	He Long

Strength
90,900+	250,000

Casualties and losses
90,900+	Several hundred

The Campaign to Suppress Bandits in Northwestern China was a counter-insurgency campaign the People's Liberation Army (PLA) fought against the remaining Nationalist and Islamic forces in northwestern mainland China.

The Nationalist forces consisted mainly of irregular forces and Nationalist Revolutionary Army troops left behind after the nationalist government fled to Taiwan. The campaign resulted in victory for the People's Republic of China.

== Order of battle ==
Nationalists: over 90,000, including nearly 20,000 regular troops of Ma clique.

- Ma Bufang's troops left behind
- Ma Hongkui's troops left behind
- Other bandits in over 100 different bands

PLA: a quarter million troop in 38 divisions, including:

- 1st Army
- 2nd Army
- 3rd Army
- 4th Army
- 5th Army
- 6th Army
- 19th Army
- 5 other armies
- Independent regiments

== Campaign ==
After dozens of battles occurred from October to December 1949, the Nationalists were driven to the remote regions of China. As a result, they adopted more guerrilla tactics. There were a total of 67 bandit groups in Gansu, over 40 bands in Shaanxi, and several bands in Xinjiang. In Qinghai, more nationalist regular troops existed, soldiers of Ma clique. In November 1949, the PLA launched a campaign to eradicate bandits completely.

From January 1950 to July 1950, attacks on the bandits were carried out by the northwestern military region on multiple fronts. From the beginning of January to the end of February, the 55th Division of the PLA 19th Army, the Ankang Independent Regiment of Shaanxi Military Region, and troops of Hanzhong Military Sub-region defeated the bandits headed by Wang Lingyun (王凌云) in southern Shaanxi.

From mid January to mid March 1950, the 1st Division of the PLA 1st Army, the 11th and 12th Division of its 2nd Army, troops of Shaanxi Yulin Military Sub-region, and the 5th Cavalry Division defeated bands of bandits, including those headed by Gao Huaixiong (高怀雄) and Zhang Tingzhi (张廷芝) in northern Shaanxi, bandits headed by Ma Yinggui (马英贵) and Ma Zhengzhong (马镇中) in Gansu, bandits headed by Ma Xiancheng (马成贤) and Mao Laowu (马老五) in Qinghai, and bandits headed by Ma Shaowu (马绍武) in Ningxia.

From mid April to the end of July 1950, the PLA 2nd, 5th and 6th Armies drove into Xinjiang, destroying bandit bases in the region of the Greater and Lesser Salt Cedar Valleys (大小红柳峡) and Black Mountain (黑山头). From May to July, The PLA destroyed the bandits headed by Ma Yuanshan (马元山) and Ma Baoyuan (马保元) in Ningxia, Qinghai, and Gansu. In May 1950, the communists changed tactics by assigning selected regions to particular military formations for bandit eradication and by the end of July 1950, over seventy thousand bandits had been killed.

From August 1950 to the end of 1952, further operations were launched against smaller bands of bandits which totaled over 10,000 in 212 bands. Most of these bandits operated in the border regions of provinces. During the Korean War, these bandits became more active supposedly under the commands of airdropped Nationalist agents.

From August 1950, the PLA 6th Cavalry Division, 7th Infantry Division, and troops from the Pingliang and Qingyang Military Sub-Districts totaling more than 15,000 begun their operation against the more than a dozen bands of bandits headed by chieftains including Guo Shuanzi (郭栓子), Ma Yanbiao (马彦彪), Ma Guoyuan (马国援) and others in Xiji (西吉), Longde (隆德), Helan Mountains and Hexi Corridor regions. After one year and eight months, the 2,000 bandits in the regions were killed.

From late January 1951 to March 1951, cavalry regiments and camel cavalry regiments of the PLA 1st Army, 2nd Army, 3rd Army and 4th Army led by Huang Xinting (黄新廷), augmented by the 27th Infantry Regiment, defeated bandits headed by Uzman and Hussein in Chaidamu Basin (柴达木盆地). In May 1952, the PLA 1st Army augmented by 8 regiments of the Qinghai Military District defeated bandits headed by Xiang Qian (项谦) in Guideangla (贵德昂拉) region of Qinghai after a 17-day long operation. During this stage, nearly 10,000 bandits surrendered and over 5,800 were killed.

In December 1952, there was a conference on further deployment of PLA troops in Northwestern Military Region to completely eradicate the Nationalist guerrilla / insurgents in the region. A total of 126 companies totaling more than 19,000 soldiers were deployed. Five regiments and a battalion of Southwestern Military Region was also mobilized to support the effort, which was completed successfully with killing 1,600 bandits headed by Ma Liang (马良) and Ma Yuanxiang (马元祥) in the border region of Qinghai, Sichuan, and Gansu. Meanwhile, over 3,700 bandits in Xinjiang were also annihilated.

== Conclusion ==
By July 1953, the campaign ended in PLA victory. Over 90,900 Nationalist guerrilla /insurgents had been killed, captured or surrendered. In addition, the PLA also captured over 80 artillery pieces and over 35,000 firearms.

== Outcome ==
Although sharing a common anticommunist goal, Nationalist guerrilla and insurgency warfare was largely handicapped by the enlistment of bandits, many of whom had previously fought and killed Nationalist troops, and also attacked and robbed landlords and business owners, an important faction that supported the Nationalist government and who were now forced into an alliance of convenience with the bandits. Differences within the ranks of the Nationalist guerillas themselves compounded these issues.

Another important contributor to the Nationalist failure was the lack of a unified command. Although the Nationalists were under the command of the Nationalist government in Taiwan, the troops only took orders from their old masters, the Ma clique. With the command thousands miles away, there was not any effective control and orders were often ignored. The distant headquarters also meant that there was a lack of current intelligence and situational awareness and thus even if Nationalist command could exercise effective control, they were unable to craft battleplans reflecting the changing reality on the ground.

== See also ==
- Kuomintang Islamic insurgency
- Outline of the Chinese Civil War
- National Revolutionary Army
- History of the People's Liberation Army
- Chinese Civil War
