= Ma Linyi =

Chinese politician

Ma Linyi was a Chinese Muslim politician born in Hunan province during the Qing Dynasty.

== Biography ==
He was born in the year 1864 and died in 1938.

In 1912, he became Minister of Education of Gansu province, appointed by the Republic of China Kuomintang government.

He founded the Association for the Promoting of Islamic Teaching in 1918 in the provincial capital of Gansu.

He, along with General Ma Fuxiang, sponsored Imam Wang Jingzhai when he went on hajj to Mecca in 1921.
