= Ma Yuanxiang =

Ma Yuanxiang 馬元祥
- Born: 10 October 1897; Hezhou, Gansu, Qing China (now Linxia County, Gansu)
- Died: 16 May 1953 (aged 55); Tongde County, Qinghai, China
- Military career
- Allegiance: Republic of China
- Branch: (Republic of China (1912–1949)) National Revolutionary Army
- Service years: 1938–1953
- Rank: Lieutenant general
- Conflicts: Second Sino-Japanese War; Kuomintang Islamic Insurgency in China (1950–1958)

Ma Yuanxiang (10 October 1897 – 16 May 1953; simplified Chinese: 马元祥; traditional Chinese: 馬元祥; pinyin: Mǎ Yuánxiáng; Wade–Giles: Ma Yüan-hsiang, Xiao'erjing: ﻣَﺎ ﻳُﻮًا ﺷِﯿْﺎ) was a Hui Muslim general in the National Revolutionary Army of the Republic of China and a member of the Ma clique.

== Biography ==
A relative of the Ma family clique, he served for many years in Qinghai with the National Revolutionary Army. During the Second Sino-Japanese War, Ma fought under the command of General Ma Biao and was wounded in action at the Battle of Huaiyang, where Japanese forces were defeated.

After pretending to surrender to the People's Liberation Army in 1949, he broke loose in 1950 and started the insurgency. Serving as a subordinate officer to Ma Liang, he commanded the 102nd Detachment of the South-western Nationalist Underground Army. Ma Yuanxiang and Ma Liang (general) fought against the Communist forces during the Kuomintang Islamic Insurgency in China (1950–1958). He was killed in battle by communist forces in 1953. Following his death, the Kuomintang government in Taiwan posthumously promoted him to lieutenant general.
