= Ma Zhanhai =

Chinese soldier and general

- Died: 1932; Qinghai, Republic of China
- Military career
- Allegiance: Republic of China
- Service years: 1930–1932
- Rank: general
- Unit: Qinghai Army
- Commands: General in the National Revolutionary Army, Battalion Commander
- Conflicts: Sino-Tibetan War †

Ma Zhanhai (simplified Chinese: 马占海; traditional Chinese: 馬占海, died 1932) was a Chinese Muslim Battalion Commander who was killed in action during the Qinghai Tibet War which was part of the Sino-Tibetan War. He served in Ma Bufang's Qinghai army.
