= Ma Fuxiang =

Hui Chinese warlord (1876–1932)

Ma Fuxiang 馬福祥 مَا فُ‌ثِیَانْ
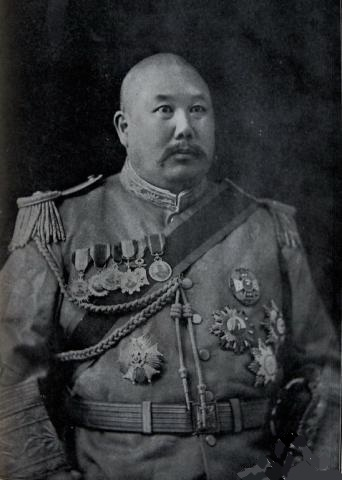
- Lieutenant General Ma Fuxiang

Acting Chief Executive Officer of Kokonur (Qinghai, then a region of Gansu Province)
- In office July 1912 – August 1912
- Preceded by: Qing Shu (Ch'ing Shu)
- Succeeded by: Lian Xing (Lien Hsing)

Military Governor of Ningxia (then a region of Gansu Province)
- In office 1912–1920
- Preceded by: Chang Lian (Ch'ang Lien)
- Succeeded by: Ma Hongbin (Ma Hung-pin)

Military Governor of Suiyuan Province
- In office 26 May 1921 – January 1925
- Preceded by: Cai Chengxun (Ts'ai Ch'eng-hsün)
- Succeeded by: Li Minzhong (Li Min-chung)

Mayor of Qingdao
- In office November 1929 – March 1930
- Preceded by: Wu Siyu (Wu Szu-yü)
- Succeeded by: Ge Jingen (Ke Chin-ken)

Governor of Anhui Province
- In office March 1930 – September 1930
- Preceded by: Wang Chin-yü (Wang Jinyu)
- Succeeded by: Ch'en Tiao-yuan (Chen Diaoyuan)

Chairman of the Mongolian and Tibetan Affairs Commission
- In office 8 September 1930 – 30 December 1931
- Preceded by: Yan Xishan
- Succeeded by: Shi Qingyang

Personal details
- Born: 4 February 1876 Linxia County, Gansu, Qing Empire
- Died: 19 August 1932 (aged 56) Beijing, Republic of China
- Party: Kuomintang
- Children: Ma Hongkui
- Awards: Order of Rank and Merit; Order of the Precious Brilliant Golden Grain; Order of Wen-Hu; Order of Leopold (Belgium)

Military service
- Allegiance: Qing Dynasty; China
- Years of service: 1889–1932
- Rank: General
- Unit: Kansu Braves
- Commands: Governor of Altay
- Battles/wars: Dungan revolt (1895–1896), Boxer Rebellion, Zhili–Anhui War, Second Zhili–Fengtian War, Central Plains War, Northern Expedition

Ma Fuxiang (traditional Chinese: 馬福祥; simplified Chinese: 马福祥; pinyin: Mǎ Fúxiáng; Wade–Giles: Ma Fu-hsiang, Xiao'erjing: مَا فُ‌ثِیَانْ, French romanization: Ma-Fou-hiang or Ma Fou-siang; 4 February 1876 – 19 August 1932) was a Chinese Muslim scholar, military officer and politician, spanning from the Qing Dynasty through the early Republic of China. His positions illustrated the power of family, the role of religious affiliations and the interaction of Inner Asian China and the national government of China. A prominent Muslim warlord in northwest China, Ma Fuxiang originally served under Dong Fuxiang, like other Ma Clique Muslim warlords such as Ma Anliang.

Ma was born in Linxia, Gansu. He was named the military governor of Xining and then of Altay, in Qing times. He held a large number of military posts in the northwestern region after the founding of the republic. He was governor of Qinghai in 1912, Ningxia from 1912 to 1920, and Suiyuan from 1920 to 1925. Having turned to Chiang Kai-shek in 1928, he was made chairman (governor) of the government of Anhui in 1930. He was elected a member of the National Government Commission and then appointed the mayor of Qingdao, special municipality. He was also the president of the Mongolian–Tibetan Commission and a member of the Central Executive Committee of the Kuomintang. He died in August 1932.

== Life and military service ==
=== Family history ===
It was said by American scholar Louis M. J. Schram that Ma Fuxiang himself was of Sant'a descent, who had assimilated into the Hui community. The Santa (San-t'a) are known as the Dongxiang people. They are Mongol Muslims.

Schram reported that Ma Fuxiang's Sant'an ancestors belonged to a group of Mongols who converted to Islam under threat of death during the Qianlong Emperor's reign (1736–1796), since the area where they lived, around Hezhou, was dominated by Muslim Salar rebels at the time. Another separate group of Mongol Muslims existed in Hezhou's east. Their leaders claimed a lineage from the Yuan dynasty royal family.

However, no other source mentions this. He is just said to be a Hui with no mention of San-t'a/Dongxiang Mongol ancestors.

=== Qing Dynasty ===
Ma Fuxiang was the son of Ma Qianling. His elder brothers were Ma Fushou, Ma Fulu and Ma Fucai (馬福財). He was the 4th son. He was educated in the Quran and Spring and Autumn Annals. He started studying with Ma Fulu at a martial arts hall in 1889; he and Ma Fushou then studied military school three years later. In 1895 he served under Gen. Dong Fuxiang, leading loyalist Chinese Muslims to crush a revolt by rebel Muslims in the Dungan revolt (1895–1896). The rebel Muslims were slaughtered and beheaded by the thousands by Ma Fuxiang's forces and his commanding officers received the severed heads from Ma. In 1897 a military Juren degree was awarded to Ma Fuxiang after he completed his military studies, and took the military exam.

Ma graduated in military science, having passed provincial examinations. Under the Qing dynasty he was promoted to Brigadier General at Palikum, New Dominion. (Xinjiang). He received his military training at Military School in Kansu.

Ma was transferred along with his brother Ma Fulu and several cousins as officers under Gen. Dong Fuxiang to Beijing in 1898. During the Boxer Rebellion, the Muslim troops came to be known as the "Kansu Braves" and fought against the Eight Nation Alliance. Ma Fuxiang killed many foreigners in combat. Ma led a cavalry charge against the foreign Eight Nation Alliance army at the Battle of Langfang, defeating them and forcing the Europeans to flee. He and Ma Fulu personally planned and led the attack, encircling the foreign troops with a pincer movement. The foreign invasion of Beijing was derailed by their efforts for another month. The Muslim troops engaged in fierce fighting at Zhengyang Gate in Beijing. Ma Fulu, and four of his cousins were killed in action in 1900 in Beijing during the Battle of Peking (1900), in total one hundred soldiers from his home village died in that battle at Zhengyang. He had commanded a brigade, and Ma Fuxiang took over the position after his brother's death. For the rest of the Boxer Rebellion his unit engaged in the Siege of the International Legations (Boxer Rebellion). He escorted the imperial family to Xi'an.

In March 1909 at Palikun, Xinjiang, he served as a "Brigade General". From July to August 1912 Ma was "Acting Chief Executive Officer of Kokonur" (de facto governor of Kokonor, later Qinghai Province). On 10 October 1912, he was in Altai as the "Commander of the Guards Division".

=== Beiyang ===
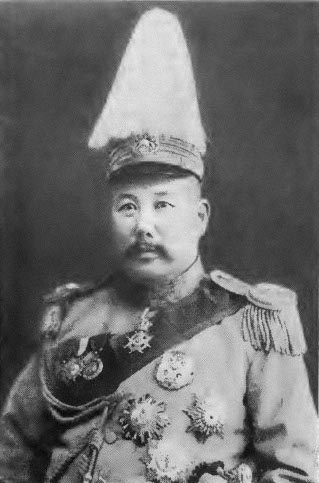
Ma Fuxiang

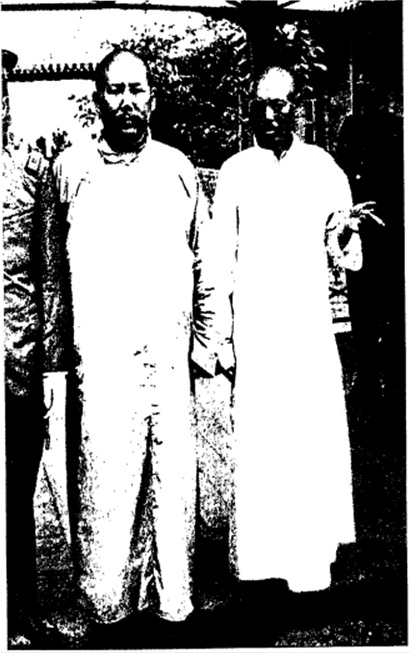
Ma Fuxiang and Gen. Wu Peifu

During the Xinhai Revolution in 1912, Ma Fuxiang protected a Catholic mission from attacks by the Gelaohui in the Sandaohe district and he also protected another Catholic mission from attacks in 1916. He and his nephew Ma Hongbin received the Order of Leopold (Belgium) ("King Leopold decoration") for their work.

Some Gansu Hui led by Ma Fuxiang joined the republicans. Gansu Hui general Ma Fuxiang did not participate with Ma Anliang in the battles with Shaanxi revolutionaries and refused to join the Qing Manchu Shengyun and Changgeng in their attempts to defend the Qing before the Qing abdication, instead the independence of Gansu from Qing control was jointly declared by non-Muslim gentry with Hui Muslim Ma Fuxiang. Ma Anliang, Changgeng and Shengyun failed to capture Shaanxi from the revolutionaries. In Ningxia, Qing forces were attacked by both Hui Muslim Gelaohui and Han Gelaohui members, while Hui general Ma Qi and Ma Yuanzhang were in the Qing forces fighting against them but Ma Yuanzhang defected to the republicans after Ma Anliang gave up on the Qing.

The Beiyang government and Yuan Shikai received Ma Fuxiang's steadfast support once he has accepted that the Qing dynasty's time had ended. The Republic appointed him to several military positions.

Ma Fuxiang was named military commander of Ningxia by president Yuan Shikai. Ma captured a Mongol separatist in Baotou and executed another Mongol prince who tried to declare himself emperor, a Buddhist monk named Ta-er Lilu-chi (Wu Daer Liufi). He was supported by the bandit Kao Shih-hsiu (Gao Shixiu). Ma Fuxiang defeated Kao in Ningxia in 1916 and the Mongol princes of Otoy, Üüsin and Qanggin pledged their allegiance to the fake emperor, presenting him with rifles. On 19 June 1916, Kao arrived with his Emperor, badly defeated by Ma Fushou, the brother of Ma Fuxiang and withdrew through Otoy to Sandaohe. In 1917, Kao was defeated at Shizzuizi, the Emperor and Kao's underlings were executed and Kao fled.

Ma Fuxiang's book, "Shuofang Daozhi", portrays these events. An account written by Frenchman Harry Serruys describes them.

"Ma Fuxiang, the commander of the Protective Army, dispatched Ma Fushou, chief of staff of the Brilliant Military Army, to attack the robbers in Zuuqa temple. Ma Fuxiang dispatched Fushou with an army to attack Kao's army at Zuuqa temple and destroyed the band. In the second month of 1917 Ma Fuxiang executed Wu Daer Liuji. Ma Fuxiang dispatched his nephew Ma Hongbin to attack Kao and Wu at Shizuishan. When Liu-chi was defeated, Ma Fuxiang ambushed him and defeated him again. Ma Fuxiang captured Yu Ling-yun, Su Xuefeng, Yao Zhankui, Zhang Zhenqing, Li Zongwen and several others; in all 18 men were executed. Ma Fuxiang wrote a commemorative inscription for men from Ningxia who died in the expedition against the bogus Emperor. In the third month of the sixth year of the Republic [1917], Ma Fuxiang was at the burial of his mother. As he reached Ning'anbu Ma Hongbin sent him a telegram stating that the bogus emperor and the other bogus generals had mounted an invasion from Suiyuan. After the victory, officers in charge of military headquarters and regular soldiers were honored."

Ma Fuxiang defeated brigands near Sandaohe (San-Tao-Ho) and expelled them from Ningxia, according to Belgian Catholic missionary J. Terstappen in 1915.

Han-Hui relations were improved during Ma Fuxiang's reign over Ningxia due to his policies.

Ma Fuxiang and the Jahriyya Sufi leader Ma Yuanzhang became enemies after Ma Fuxiang got very angry that Ma Yuanzhang refused to help him remove Zhang Guangjian as governor of Gansu and telegraphed Beijing that Zhang should remain as governor. Ma Fuxiang and other Gansu generals believed that a native of Gansu province should be governor rather than an outsider. Ma Fuxiang himself was considered the most eligible person to serve as Governor of Gansu after Zhang's unsuccessful term, because of his military service under the Qing and Republic of China and his rule over Ningxia.

He invested in the wool trade and a factory that made matches.

Ma Fuxiang effectively took Ma Anliang's place as de facto leader of Muslims in northwest China when Ma Anliang died in 1918.

Ma Fuxiang was involved in relief efforts in Lanzhou during the 1920 Haiyuan earthquake.

Ma was appointed Military Governor of Suiyuan by the Beiyang government and served in that position from 1921 to 1925. Suiyuan had a 640-kilometre (400-mile) river valley and a railroad. American businessmen reported that Ma Fuxiang considered modernizing infrastructure in the region with motorized transport. A Department of Industry and a Department of Education were established in Suiyuan by Ma Fuxiang while he was military governor there.

Ma Fuxiang, a member of the Zhili clique, signed a denunciation of the Anhui clique and its military arm, the Anfu Club led by Xu Shuzheng and Duan Qirui. The denunciation was circulated through a telegram called Paoting-fu, on 12 July 1920. The Zhili clique was led by Wu Peifu. At the time Ma was Defense Commissioner of Ningxia, Gansu. This led to the Zhili–Anhui War.

The Gelaohui and Ma Fuxiang came to an agreement in 1922, in which Ma Fuxiang agreed to allow the Gelaohui to extort protection money from wool merchants in Baotou. Ma Fuxiang controlled Baotou militarily while the central government in Beijing controlled Baotou's jurisdiction.

Ma Fuxiang, as supervisor in Suiyuan, sent telegrams regarding the uniting of Rehe and Chahar for defense purposes from January–September 1924.

Ma Fuxiang allied with Gen. Wu Peifu and acquired land from the political separation of Inner Mongolia from Zhang Zuolin. Ma Fuxiang's nephew Ma Hongbin was in charge of his army, and his civil administrator was a non-Muslim. Ma Hongbin read to Upton Close the revelations of a preacher in Shandong who advocated the union of Buddhism, Islam, Daoism, Catholicism and Protestantism in China under Confucianism.

According to The Trans-Pacific, Volume 6, Ma Fuxiang "religiously tolerant" and "materially progressive", since when he was served food cooked by non-Muslims or even presented with wine, while he was amidst with non-Muslims, he was willing to eat and drink. According to Upton Close, he did not drink wine or smoke tobacco, but he served them to guests.

Ma Fuxiang's wife died in 1927 in Beijing, and a funeral was held in Hochow. She was one of his multiple wives.

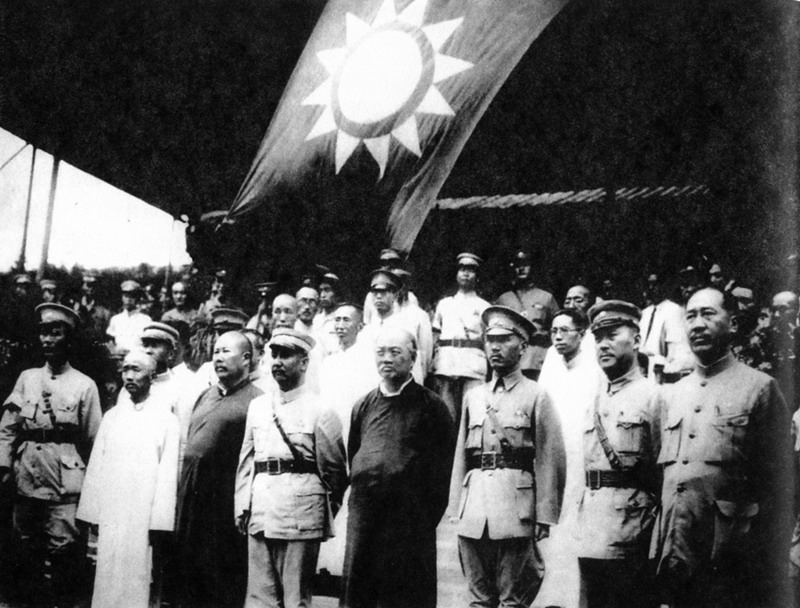
Chinese generals pay tribute to the Sun Yat-sen Mausoleum in Beijing in 1928 after the success of the Northern Expedition. From right to left, are Gen. Cheng Jin, Gen. Zhang Zuobao, Gen. Chen Diaoyuan, Gen. Chiang Kai-shek, Gen. Woo Tsin-hang, Gen. Wen Xishan, Muslim Gen. Ma Fuxiang, Gen. Ma Sida and Muslim Gen. Bai Chongxi.

=== Kuomintang ===
In 1924, Ma Fuxiang met with Kuomintang leader Dr. Sun Yat-sen in Beijing and informed him that he would welcome the leadership of Dr. Sun.

Ma Fuxiang then joined the Kuomintang during the Northern Expedition in 1928. He and his son Ma Hongkui were originally generals in Feng Yuxiang's army. He became a member of the Kuomintang Central Committee, member of the State Council, Mayor of Qingdao, Governor of Anhui and chairman of the Mongolian and Tibetan Affairs Commission. Ma Fuxiang founded Islamic organizations sponsored by the Kuomintang, including the China Islamic Association (Zhongguo Huijiao Gonghui).

Ma Fuxiang and other Muslim warlords like Ma Qi broke with Feng Yuxiang's Guominjun during the Central Plains War and pledged allegiance to Chiang Kai-shek and the Kuomintang in the name of nationalism. In his involvement in national politics, Ma was alone among the Muslim warlords.

Ma was governor of Anhui from March–September 1930.

In Nanjing in April 1931 Ma Fuxiang attended a national leadership conference with Chiang Kai-shek and Zhang Xueliang, in which Chiang and Zhang dauntlessly upheld that Manchuria was part of China in the face of the Japanese invasion.

Prominent Muslims like Ma Liang (general), Ma Fuxiang and Bai Chongxi met in 1931 in Nanjing to discuss inter communal tolerance between Hui and Han.

Ma gave explorer Sven Hedin permission to enter Gansu.

Ma was also appointed as a member of the Central Executive Committee of the Kuomintang.

=== Army ===
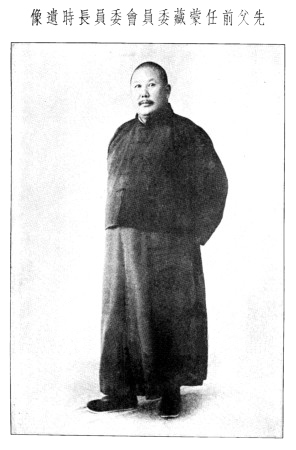
Ma Fuxiang

Ma Fuxiang recruited Salars for his army, classifying them into five inner clans and eight outer clans. He designated the assimilated Tibetan-speaking Salars as the "outer" group. These Salars were both fluent in Salar and Chinese. Some were uniformed and had carbines, rifles, pistols and binoculars. Muslims from Hezhou served in his cavalry.

Dongxiang people were also known as Santa (San-t'a) people, and many of them reportedly served in Ma Fuxiang's army. It was even said that Ma Fuxiang himself was of Santa descent, and had assimilated into the Hui community. The Santa Muslim Dongxiang Mongols continued to play a major role in his army, protecting towns. Ma Fuxiang's Santa troops maintained an old Mongol and Qing custom of distributing specially marked arrows as tokens to officers to show their status.

Among the posts he held was Commander of the 6th Mixed Brigade of Gansu Army in 1922 and 7th Division of the Northwest Army in 1926.

Ma Fuxiang had inherited his army from his family, from Ma Fulu and Ma Qianling. He then bequeathed it on to his son Ma Hongkui.

== Drug trafficking ==
The opium trade thrived in Suiyuan province during the Republican era in China.

Opium (poppy) farming was already thriving in Suiyuan by the time Ma Fuxiang became the military governor in 1921, due to the fact that soldiers were not being paid their salaries at all, so they resorted to dealing with opium farmers to make money. Poppy farming had been banned by Ma Fuxiang in Gansu, but he admitted when he was appointed as Military Governor of Suiyuan that since the opium trade in Suiyuan was so rampant, that he both could not and would not deal with the situation.

In 1923, an officer of the Bank of China from Baotou found out that Ma Fuxiang was assisting the drug trade in opium which helped finance his military expenses. He earned a sum of $2 million from taxing those sales in 1923. General Ma had been using the Bank, a branch of the Government of China's exchequer, to arrange for silver currency to be transported to Baotou to use it to sponsor the trade.

While Ma caused opium to become rampant due to his support for the cultivation of opium and its trade in Suiyuan, he also enabled policies which benefited the residents in Suiyuan, filling posts in military, educational, and administrative manners with Suiyuan people and expanding education.

Senators started an impeachment against Ma Fuxiang over his involvement in the opium trade and farming. Ma had created a monopoly over the opium trade in addition to supporting the farming of opium.

It was hoped that Ma Fuxiang would have improved the situation, since Chinese Muslims were well known for opposition to smoking opium.

Ma Fuxiang officially prohibited opium and made it illegal in Ningxia, but the Guominjun reversed his policy. By 1933, people from every level of society were abusing the drug and Ningxia was left in destitution.

On 11 September 1930, Ma Fuxiang celebrated his birthday in Suiyuan, Inner Mongolia, His annual opium profits reached $15,000,000. A film of this event and his poppy fields was recorded by Universal Newspaper Newsreel.

Ma Fuxiang's army also contained many of the Chinese Muslim opium runners in western Inner Mongolia. A lot of the opium from Gansu was being traded by Ma Fuxiang's Hezhou (Ho Chou) Muslim cavalry.

== Donations to education ==
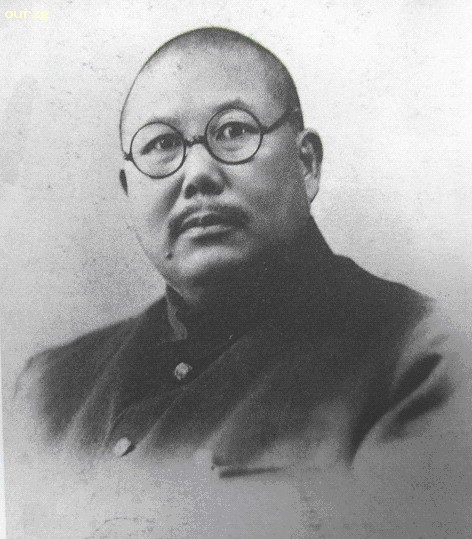
Ma Fuxiang

Ma Fuxiang, along with Ma Linyi, sponsored Imam Wang Jingzhai when he went on hajj to Mecca in 1921.

Ma Fuxiang supported Imam Hu Songshan.

The Hui Muslim Chengda Teacher's Academy was supported by Ma Fuxiang, along with other Kuomintang Muslim officials. The Chengda Teacher's Academy was involved in reforming education and instilling Chinese nationalism among the Hui Muslims.

Ma built many elementary and high schools for Muslims throughout northwest China. He founded the Association for the Promoting of Islamic Teaching in 1918 in the provincial capital of Gansu. For the purpose of educating and building a class of intellectuals among the Hui in northwest China, Beijing's Xibei Gongxue (the Northwestern Middle School) and the Yuehua were financed by Ma Fuxiang. He believed that modern education would help Hui Chinese build a better society and help China resist foreign imperialism and help build the nation. He had both the military authority and economic power to help fund education. Until he died in 1932, 100 yuan every month was donated by him for education. He established a public library in Ningxia, and sponsored various Muslim schools. He was a Chinese nationalist and a Confucianist, and was praised for his "guojia yizhi" (national consciousness) by non-Muslims. He also invested in new editions and reprintings of Confucian and Islamic texts. He edited "Shuofang Daozhi". a gazette, and books such as "Meng Cang ZhuangKuang: Hui Bu Xinjiang fu".

A new edition of a book by Ma Te-hsin, "Ho-yin Ma Fu-ch'u hsien-sheng i-shu Ta hua tsung kuei Ssu tien yaohui", which was printed in 1865, was reprinted in 1927 by Ma Fuxiang.

Yunting (雲亭) was the courtesy name of Ma Fuxiang. A school, the Yunting Provincial Normal School, was named after him. Ma promoted Muslim women's education in Shaanxi.

== Ideology ==
Ma had an interest in Chinese classical learning and western engineering and science. He thought his own Hui people fiercely loyal but "primitive" and lacking in "the educational and political privileges of the Han Chinese". Ma encouraged Huis to assimilate into Chinese civilization and culture, and created the Assimilationist Group to promote this idea. Ma Fuxiang's assimilationist organization a mix of Islam and Confucianism with Hui being considered an integral part of China, the name of this organization was the Assimilationist (Neixiang) clique.

The learned "scholar" Gen. Ma Fuxiang was considered "progressive" while the senior de facto leader of Muslims in Northwest China, Gen. Ma Anliang, was considered "reactionary". Ma was considered both a warlord and a Muslim scholar.

Ma Fuxiang took a stance against religious sectarianism and the menhuan (Islamic sects in China) since he believed that it was the cause of violence, and in order to keep positive Han and Hui relations. He promoted education for Muslims instead of backing certain sects and Imams, and also studied Confucianism, and republished Islamic texts and translations. Ma supported strengthening China and promoting unity between different sects of Islam in China, which Imams like Hu Songshan advocated.

== Calligraphy ==
One of Ma Fuxiang's calligraphic works was a cursive rendering of the Chinese character for Tiger (虎) in ink on a scroll. It was marked with his seals. It was auctioned at Oriental Art Sales in 1980, and at Christie's on 16–17 September 2010.

An inscription was written at Mount Tai by Ma Fuxiang.

== Family ==
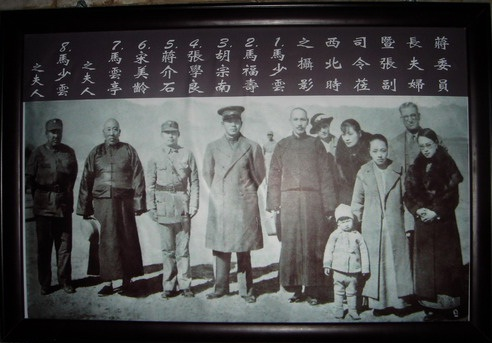
Ma Fuxiang's brother Ma Fushou, with Chiang Kai-shek.

Ma Fuxiang's father was Ma Qianling. Ma's son Ma Hongkui became a general in the National Revolutionary Army.

He had several wives. One of them died in 1927 in Beijing, and a funeral was held in Hochow. Another wife, Ma Tsai (te), was the one who gave birth to Ma Hongkui on 14 March 1892. She died in 1948.

His nephew was Ma Hongbin, another general. His brothers were Ma Fulu, Ma Fushou and Ma Fucai. He became a Sworn brother of President Chiang Kai-shek.

He became so prominent and well known that some Jewish organizations in the United States claimed that his father was Jewish.

== Mongolia and Tibet ==
Ma Fuxiang, as the chairman of the Mongolian and Tibetan Affairs Commission, made a statement that Mongolia and Tibet were parts of the Republic of China:

Our Party takes the development of the weak and small and resistance to the strong and violent as our sole and most urgent task. This is even more true for those groups which are not of our kind (非我族類者). Now the peoples [minzu] of Mongolia and Tibet are closely related to us, and we have great affection for one another: our common existence and common honor already have a history of over a thousand years.... Mongolia and Tibet's life and death are China's life and death. China absolutely cannot cause Mongolia and Tibet to break away from China's territory, and Mongolia and Tibet cannot reject China to become independent. At this time, there is not a single nation on earth except China that will sincerely develop Mongolia and Tibet."

In 1930 Ma met with the Tibetan dKon-mchog-gro-nyi to talk about Tibetan matters, since he was assigned to deal with Tibetan related issues. Chiang Kai-shek had delegated dKon-mchog-gro-nyi to communicate with the 13th Dalai Lama over the issue of the 9th Panchen Lama, who had fled Tibet and joined the Chinese government after a dispute against the 13th Dalai Lama. The Dalai Lama sent a message to Ma Fuxiang on 28 December 1930, accusing the Panchen Lama's adherents of inciting Sichuan warlords during the Sino-Tibetan War.

During the Sino-Tibetan War, Ma Fuxiang, as head of the Mongolian and Tibetan Affairs Commission, sent a telegraph to Muslim Kuomintang official Tang Kesan ordering him to breach the agreement with Tibet, because he was concerned that political rivals among the Kuomintang in Nanjing were using the incident for their own gains.

Ma Fuxiang opened a session of the Mongolian Affairs Conference in 1931 with an inaugural speech. In the conference, China condemned the division of Outer Mongolia and Tannu Tuva by the Soviets. Ma then led the closing ceremony of the conference on 12 July.

== Death ==
Ma Fuxiang died around Lianghsiang, 19 August 1932, while he was traveling to Beijing to receive medical treatment, from Chikungsan around Hankou.

== See also ==
- Ma clique
