= Campaign to Suppress Bandits in Southwestern China =

1950 counterinsurgency campaign

- Part of Chinese Civil War
| Date | February 1950 – December 1953 |
| Location | Southwest China |
| Result | Communist victory |

Belligerents
| (Taiwan) Republic of China: Gelaohui | People's Republic of China |

Commanders and leaders
| Ma Hushan | Deng Xiaoping |

The Campaign to Suppress Bandits in Southwestern China was a counterinsurgency campaign carried out by forces of the Chinese Communist Party (CCP) against Chinese Nationalist guerrillas, mostly consisting of Nationalist forces who had not withdrawn from mainland China during the retreat to Taiwan, along with locals. The campaign took place after the conclusion of World War II, during the Chinese Civil War in Southwest China. The campaign ended in a CCP victory.

== Origin ==
The majority of the insurgents were former members of Ma Bufang's Republic of China Army (Ma clique). Several of them were prominent generals, such as Ma Hushan, who had earlier fought against the Soviet Union in Xinjiang. Others had fought against the Japanese in the Second Sino-Japanese War, including General Ma Yuanxiang, who fought under the command of General Ma Biao and was wounded in action at the Battle of Huaiyang, where the Japanese were defeated.

Ma Bufang, Ma Hushan, and the other leaders who led the revolt were all former National Revolutionary Army soldiers and Kuomintang members. Many of the involved insurgents were veterans of the Soviet invasion of Xinjiang, Sino-Tibetan War, the Second Sino-Japanese War, Ili Rebellion, and the Chinese Civil War. The Muslim insurgents were reported to consist of Hui people, Salar people, or Dongxiang people.

Ma Bufang and Ma Chengxiang's forces were stationed across Qinghai and Xinjiang along with Ospan Batyr's men, who were originally battling Soviet-backed Uyghur rebels in the Ili Rebellion and the Mongols and Russians at the Battle of Baitag Bogd before the Communist victory in the Civil War and subsequent incorporation of Xinjiang into the People's Republic of China. The anti-separatist, pro-Kuomintang Uyghur Yulbars Khan fought a final action at the Battle of Yiwu before fleeing to Taiwan.

== Campaign ==
After the Chengdu campaign concluded in December 1949, retreating Nationalist military units joined forces with locals to continue fighting against the Communists. In 1950, there were 1.08 million anticommunist insurgents across China, with 655,000 of them in the southwest of the country. Following the outbreak of the Korean War, the insurgent ranks swelled as sympathetic locals, convinced that the war would become another world war, placed their stakes on the return of the KMT.

Insurgent forces, consistently labeled "bandits" in communist sources, were heterogeneous, ranging from irregular KMT troops commanded by nationalist officers or intelligence agents to local outlaws. Bai Chongxi, a native of Guangxi Province, developed a "total war" strategy for the region, which was stymied by the poor quality of remaining KMT troops in the area and lacking coordination among commanders. The influx of KMT troops was supported by a spontaneous rebellion which rose against communist authorities in January 1950, after which it was decided that counterinsurgency activities would have to take on a harder edge.

Beginning in February 1950, the Communists launched attacks on Nationalist forces in wealthier areas adjacent to nearby communication/transportation lines, gradually expanding into more remote regions. The Communist 3rd Corps, IV Corps, V Corps, XVIII Corps and the 7th Army of the I Corps, totaling seventeen armies, were deployed for the campaign. From March 1953 onward, the Communists first targeted larger groups of Nationalist forces. Due to heavy Nationalist activity in Sichuan, the planned deployment of Communist troops in Tibet was postponed. The 11th Army and the 12th Army, totaling six divisions of the Communist III Corps, were assigned to eastern Sichuan. Eight divisions from the 10th, 18th, and 15th Armies of the Communist southern Sichuan Military Region were assigned to southern Sichuan. Seven divisions of the 60th Army, 62nd Army, and 7th Army of the Western Sichuan Military Region were assigned to western Sichuan. The 61st Army was assigned to northern Sichuan, and the 62nd Army was assigned to Xikang. The 13th Army, 14th Army, and units of the 15th Army of the Communist IV Corps were tasked to eradicate Nationalists in Yunnan. The 16th Army of III Corps was assigned to Guizhou. Command responsibility fell to Deng Xiaoping, Liu Bocheng, and He Long.

The communist campaign opened with the swift capture of major cities, allowing the insurgents to flee into the hilly countryside. The Communist forces of the southwest made extensive use of locally raised militia forces. By late 1951, over 330,000 people in Guizhou had been mobilized into anti-insurgent militias, representing an absolute majority of the provincial population. Spontaneous outbreaks of local anticommunist rebellion in support of the KMT were suppressed by these militias, which were supervised by Tao Zhu and Ye Jianying. Beyond their narrow counterinsurgency duties, these militias attacked landlords and other representatives of China's pre-revolutionary society; in this sense, counterinsurgency and land reform went hand in hand. A key component of the grassroots counterinsurgency campaign involved the confiscation of privately held weapons, which were requisitioned for use by communist militias.

Communist strategy was adaptable based on local circumstances: in heavily Yao areas of Guangxi, combat duties were mostly shifted to special operations teams, cadres were instructed to respect local cultural practices, and both land reform and gun confiscation initiatives were limited.

According to a 1950 issue of New Observer, a Beijing-based communist biweekly periodical, "over 280,000 bandits of south-west China were liquidated." Tens of thousands of "bandits" were captured and rehabilitated over the course of the campaign, and the communist party made a concerted effort to offer former KMT officers jobs in order to cut them off from the insurgency. High-ranking officers and "hegemonic landlords" were targeted for execution. On May Day 1951, Guangxi's provincial leaders announced that major counterinsurgency operations had ceased, with 374,146 insurgents "annihilated". Thousands of small arms, along with a handful of artillery pieces, were captured over the course of the counterinsurgency.

By late 1952, remaining counterinsurgency activities constituted mopping-up operations. The campaign was officially ended in December 1953. The PLA estimated that it had "exterminated" 1.16 million insurgents across the southwest.

== See also ==
- Outline of the Chinese Civil War
- History of the People's Liberation Army
