= Qinghai–Tibet War =

1932 conflict between Tibet and Ma Clique warlords

- Part of the Sino-Tibetan War
| Date | 1932–1933 |
| Location | Qinghai, Xikang |
| Result | Chinese victory |

Belligerents
| China | Tibet |

Commanders and leaders
| Ma Bufang; Ma Zhanhai †; Ma Biao | Ngapo Shapé (Governor of Kham) |

Units involved
| National Revolutionary Army Ground Forces: Ma clique; Qinghai army | Tibet Army |

Casualties and losses
| Unknown | Unknown |

Qinghai–Tibet War
- Traditional Chinese: 青藏戰爭
- Simplified Chinese: 青藏战争
Transcriptions
Standard Mandarin
- Hanyu Pinyin: Qīngzàng zhànzhēng
other Mandarin
- Xiao'erjing: شٍ ذْﺎ جً ﺟْﻊ

The Qinghai–Tibet War or the Tsinghai–Tibet War was a conflict that took place during the Sino-Tibetan War. The 13th Dalai Lama wanted to expand the original conflict taking place between the Tibetan Army and Liu Wenhui (Sichuan clique) in Xikang, to attack Qinghai, a region northeast of Tibet. Using a dispute over a monastery in Yushu in Qinghai as an excuse in 1932, the Tibetan army attacked. Qinghai Muslim General Ma Bufang overran the Tibetan armies and recaptured several counties in Xikang province. Shiqu, Dege and other counties were seized from the Tibetans. The war against the Tibetan army was led by the Muslim General Ma Biao.

The Tibetans were pushed back to the other side of the Jinsha river. The Qinghai army recaptured counties that had been controlled by the Tibetan army since 1919. The victory on the part of the Qinghai army threatened the supply lines to Tibetan forces in Garze and Xinlong. As a result, this part of the Tibetan army was forced to withdraw. Ma and Liu warned Tibetan officials not to dare cross the Jinsha river again. By August the Tibetans lost so much territory to Liu Wenhui and Ma Bufang's forces that the Dalai Lama telegraphed British officials in India for assistance. British diplomatic pressure led China to declare a cease-fire. Separate truces were signed by Ma and Liu with the Tibetans in 1933, ending the fighting. After the war, their victory over the Tibetans was celebrated by Xikang and Qinghai soldiers.

== War summary ==
In 1931, Ma Biao became leader of the Yushu Defense Brigade. He was the second brigade commander while the first brigade was led by Ma Xun. Wang Jiamei was his secretary during the war against Tibet. Ma Biao fought to defend Lesser Surmang against the attacking Tibetans on 24–26 March 1932. The invading Tibetan forces massively outnumbered Ma Biao's defending Qinghai forces. Cai Zuozhen, the local Qinghai Tibetan Buddhist Buqing tribal chief, was fighting on the Qinghai side against the invading Tibetans.

Their forces retreated to the capital of Yushu county, Jiegue, under Ma Biao to defend it against the Tibetans while the Republic of China government under Chiang Kai-shek was petitioned for military aid like wireless telegraphs, money, ammunition and rifles.

A wireless telegraph was sent and solved the communication problem. Ma Xun was sent to reinforce the Qinghai forces and accompanied by propagandists, while mobile films and medical treatment provided by doctors awed the primitive Tibetan locals.

Ma Xun reinforced Jiegu after Ma Biao fought for more than 2 months against the Tibetans. The Tibetan army numbered 3,000. Repeated Tibetan attacks were repulsed by Ma Biao—even though his troops were outnumbered—since the Tibetans were poorly prepared for war, and so they suffered heavier casualties than the Qinghai army. Dud cannon rounds were fired by the Tibetans and their artillery was useless. Ma Lu was sent with more reinforcements to assist Ma Biao and Ma Xun along with La Pingfu. Jiegu's siege was relieved by La Pingfu on 20 August 1932, which freed Ma Biao and Ma Xun's soldiers to assault the Tibetans. Hand-to-hand combat with swords ensued as the Tibetan army was slaughtered by the "Great Sword" group of the Qinghai army in a midnight attack led by Ma Biao and Ma Xun. The Tibetans suffered massive casualties and fled the battlefield as they were routed. The land occupied in Yushu by the Tibetans was retaken.

Both the Tibetan army and Ma Biao's soldiers committed war crimes according to Cai. Tibetan soldiers had raped nuns and women (local Qinghai Tibetans) after looting monasteries and destroying villages in Yushu while Tibetan soldiers who were surrendering and fleeing were summarily executed by Ma Biao's soldiers and supplies were seized from the local nomad civilians by Ma Biao's army.

Ma Biao ordered the religious books, items, and statues of the Tibetan Gadan monastery which had started the war, to be destroyed since he was furious at their role in the war. He ordered the burning of the monastery by the Yushu Tibetan Buddhist chief Cai. But Cai could not bring himself to burn the temple and lied to Biao that the temple had been burned it. Ma Biao seized thousands of silver dollars' worth of items from local nomads as retribution for them assisting the invading Tibetan army. On 24 and 27 August, massive artillery duels occurred in Surmang between the Tibetans and Qinghai army. 200 Tibetans soldiers were killed in battle by the Qinghai army after the Tibetans came to reinforce their positions. Greater Surmang was abandoned by the Tibetans as they came under attack by La Pingfu on 2 September. In Batang, La Pingfu, Ma Biao, and Ma Xun met Ma Lu's reinforcements on 20 September.

Liu Wenhui, the Xikang warlord, had reached an agreement with Ma Bufang and Ma Lin's Qinghai army to strike the Tibetans in Xikang. A coordinated joint Xikang-Qinghai attack against the Tibetan army at Qingke monastery led to a Tibetan retreat from the monastery and the Jinsha river. Xikang army officers were allowed to issue commands to Ma Bufang's Qinghai soldiers by Ma Bufang and telegraphs operated by Liu Wenhui sent messages for Ma Bufang to his soldiers.

The reputation of the Muslim forces of Ma Bufang was boosted by the war and victory against the Tibetan army.

The stature of Ma Biao rose over his role in the war and later in 1937 his battles against the Japanese propelled him to fame nationwide in China. Chinese control of the border areas of Kham and Yushu was guarded by the Qinghai army. Chinese Muslim-run schools used their victory in the war against Tibet to show how they defended China's territorial integrity, which Japan had begun violating in 1937.

A play was written and presented in 1936 to Qinghai's "Islam Progressive Council schools" by Shao Hongsi on the war against Tibet with the part of Ma Biao appearing in the play where he defeated the Tibetans. The play presented Ma Biao and Ma Bufang as heroes who defended Yushu from being lost to the Tibetans and comparing it to the Japanese invasion of Manchuria, saying the Muslims stopped the same scenario from happening in Yushu. Ma Biao and his fight against the Japanese were hailed at the schools of the Islam Progressive Council of Qinghai. The emphasis on military training in schools and their efforts to defend China were emphasized in Kunlun magazine by Muslims. In 1939 his battles against the Japanese led to recognition across China.

== See also ==
- Sino-Tibetan War
