= Ma Liang (general) =

Ma clique general

- Born: Linxia County, Gansu
- Military career
- Allegiance: Republic of China
- Branch: (Republic of China (1912–1949)) National Revolutionary Army
- Service years: 1950–1953
- Rank: Lieutenant General
- Unit: 103rd Route Army
- Commands: Commander-in-chief of the 103rd Route Army
- Conflicts: Kuomintang Islamic Insurgency in China (1950–1958)

Ma Liang (traditional Chinese: 馬良; simplified Chinese: 马良; pinyin: Mǎ Liáng) was a Chinese Muslim General and a member of the Ma Clique.

Ma Liang was born in Linxia County, Gansu. Prominent Muslims like Ma Liang, Ma Fuxiang and Bai Chongxi met in 1931 in Nanjing to discuss inter communal tolerance between Hui and Han.

He was related to former Governor Ma Bufang of Qinghai, and he had 2,000 Chinese Muslim troops under his command around Gansu/Qinghai during the Kuomintang Islamic Insurgency in China (1950–1958). Chiang Kai-shek sent agents in May 1952 to communicate with him, and Chiang offered him the post of Commander-in-chief of the 103rd Route of the Kuomintang army, which was accepted by Ma. The CIA dropped supplies such as ammunition, radios, and gold at Nagchuka to Ma Liang. Ma Yuanxiang was another Chinese Muslim General related to the Ma family. Ma Yuanxiang and Ma Liang struggled against the Communist forces but ultimately were defeated.
