= Ma Qianling =

Chinese general

- Born: 1826; Linxia County, Gansu
- Died: 1910 (aged 83–84)
- Allegiance: Qing dynasty
- Service years: 1872-1877
- Rank: general
- Conflicts: Dungan revolt
- Children: Ma Fuxiang; Ma Fulu; Ma Fushou; Ma Fucai

Ma Qianling
- Traditional Chinese: 馬千齡
- Simplified Chinese: 马千龄
Transcriptions
Standard Mandarin
- Hanyu Pinyin: Mǎ Qiānlíng
other Mandarin
- Xiao'erjing: مَا کِیًالٍ

Ma Qianling (simplified Chinese: 马千龄; traditional Chinese: 馬千齡; pinyin: Mǎ Qiānlíng, Xiao'erjing: مَا کِیًالٍ; 1826–1910) was a Chinese Muslim General who defected to the Qing Dynasty in 1872 during the Dungan revolt along with his superior General Ma Zhanao and General Ma Haiyan. He then assisted General Zuo Zongtang in crushing the rebel Muslims. In 1877 he and Ma Zhanao expelled Muslim rebels who refused to give up the fight from the hills around Hezhou. His four sons were, Ma Fucai, Ma Fulu, Ma Fushou, and Ma Fuxiang. His grandsons were Ma Hongbin and Ma Hongkui. He had three wives, one was a Muslim convert. His sons Ma Fulu and Ma Fuxiang inherited his army.
