= Ma Fushou =

Qing Dynasty general (died 1956)

Ma Fushou 馬福壽 مَا فُ‌شُوْ
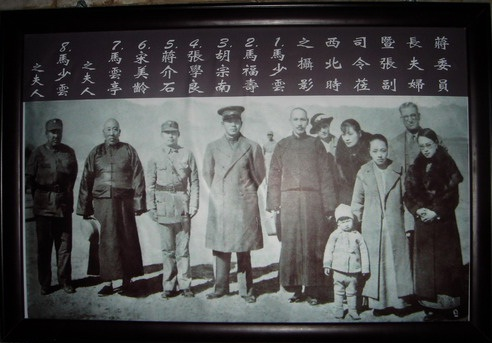
- Ma Fushou, second to the left, with Chiang Kai-shek.
- Born: c. 1860s Linxia County, Gansu, Qing China
- Died: 1956 Linxia County, Gansu, China
- Allegiance: Qing dynasty Republic of China
- Service years: 1889–1917

Ma Fushou (traditional Chinese: 馬福壽; simplified Chinese: 马福寿; pinyin: Mǎ Fúshòu; Xiao'erjing: مَا فُ‌شُوْ) was a Chinese Muslim general of the Ma clique. He served during the Qing dynasty and the early years of the Republic of China.

== Biography ==
Ma Fushou was the son of Hui Ma clique general Ma Qianling, and the brother of Ma Fucai, Ma Fulu, and Ma Fuxiang. He joined the martial arts school and graduated from military school after three years of training in 1892.

In 1917 Ma, chief of staff of the Ningxia Zhaowu Army was dispatched by Ma Fuxiang with an army to attack insurgent leader Kao Shi-hsiu's army, defeating the insurgents at the Zhaowu Temple.

After the founding of the People's Republic of China, Ma settled down in Linxia. He was over 90 years old when he died there in 1956.
