= Sino-Tibetan War of 1930–1932 =

War between China and Tibet

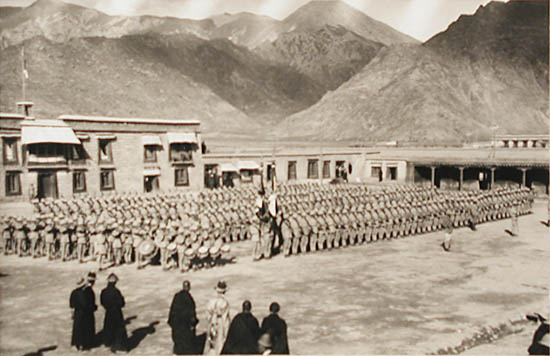
- Tibetan Army troops in 1933
Date	1930–1932
Location	Qinghai, Xikang, Tibet
Result	Chinese victory

Belligerents
China	Tibet

Commanders and leaders
Chiang Kai-shek; Ma Fuxiang; Ma Lin; Ma Bufang; Ma Biao; Liu Wenhui; Ma Xiao; Ma Zhanhai †	13th Dalai Lama

Units involved
National Revolutionary Army Ground Forces: Qinghai army (9th Division (Kokonor)); Sichuan army	Tibet Army

Strength
Several thousand Hui Muslim and Han Chinese soldiers	unknown

Casualties and losses
unknown	unknown

The Sino-Tibetan War of 1930–1932 (Chinese: 康藏糾紛; pinyin: Kāngcáng jiūfēn, lit. Kham–Tibet dispute), also known as the Second Sino-Tibetan War, began in May and June 1930 when the Tibetan Army under the 13th Dalai Lama invaded the Chinese-administered eastern Kham region (later called Xikang), and the Yushu region in Qinghai, in a struggle over control and corvée labor in Dajin Monastery. The Tibetan army, with British support, easily defeated the Sichuan army, which was focused on internal fights. Ma clique warlord Ma Bufang secretly sent a telegram to Sichuan warlord Liu Wenhui and the leader of the Republic of China, Chiang Kai-shek, suggesting a joint attack on the Tibetan forces. The Republic of China then defeated the Tibetan armies and recaptured its lost territory.

== Background ==
The roots of the conflict lay in three areas: first, the disputed border between Tibetan government territory and the territory of the Republic of China, with the Tibetan government in principle claiming areas inhabited by Tibetans in neighboring Chinese provinces (Qinghai, Sichuan) which were in fact ruled by Chinese warlords loosely aligned with the Republic; second, the tense relationship between the 13th Dalai Lama and the 9th Panchen Lama, which led to the latter's exile in Chinese-controlled territory; and third, the complexities of power politics among local Tibetan dignitaries, both religious and secular, like dispute between Yellow and Red sects of Tibetan Buddhism.

The proximate cause was that the chieftain of Beri, an area claimed by Tibet but under Sichuan control, seized the properties of the incarnate lama of Nyarong Monastery, who sought support from nearby Targye Monastery (Chinese: 大金寺). The chieftain of Beri was reportedly incited by supporters of the 9th Panchen Lama. When the Nyarong Lama and monks from Targye Monastery regained control of Nyarong Monastery in June 1930, the chieftain of Beri responded by requesting help from local Chinese warlord Liu Wenhui, the governor of Sichuan. Liu's forces quickly took control of the area. The Targye monks in turn requested the aid of the Tibetan government, whose forces entered Beri and drove Liu Wenhui's army out.

== Conflict ==
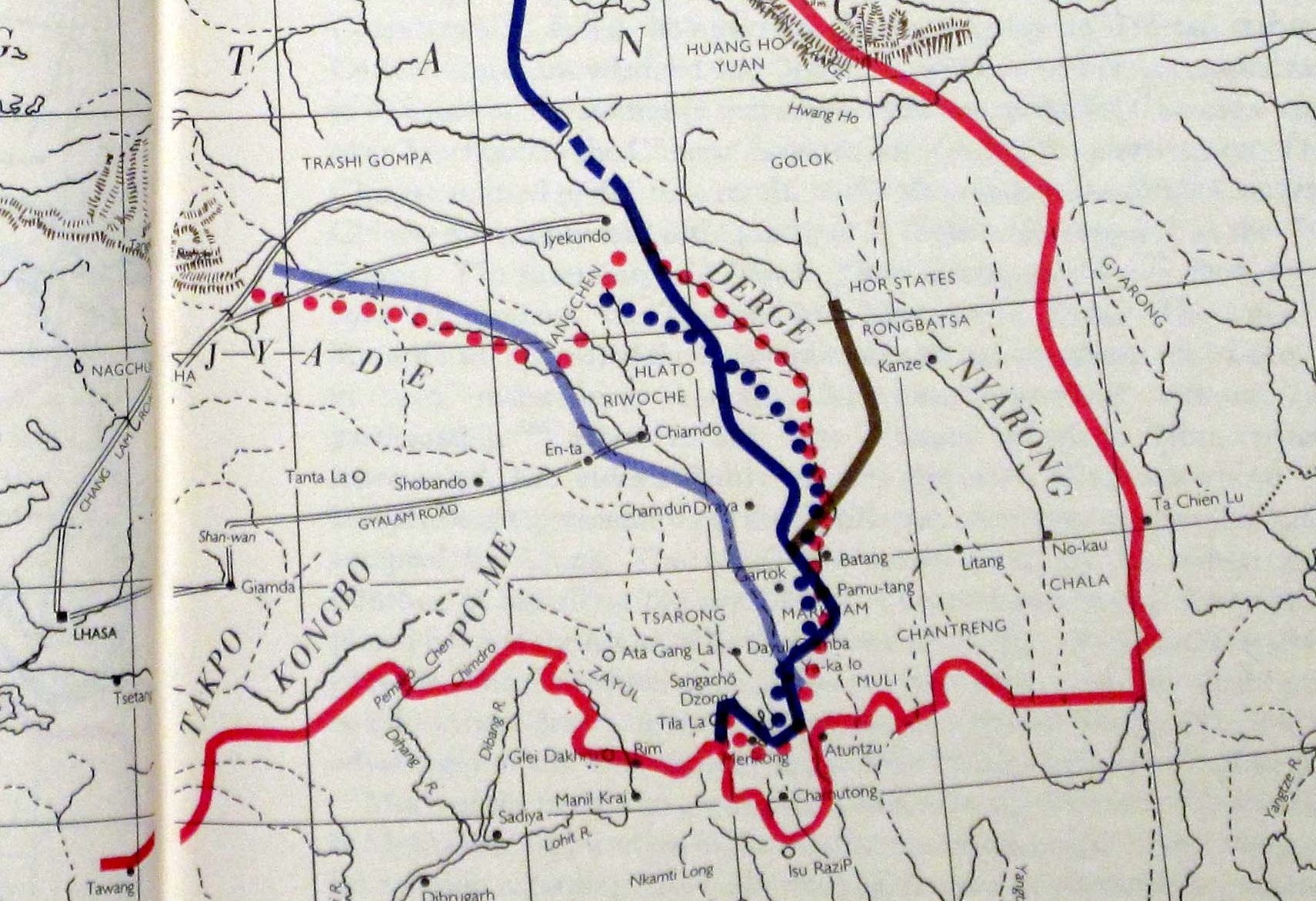
The border between Lhasa-controlled ("Outer Tibet") and Chinese-controlled ("Inner Tibet") regions in Kham, 1912–1945. The dark blue line represents the boundary proposed in the 1914 Simla Convention and the red line the overall boundary of Tibet. The remaining lines represent actual control: the dotted blue line up to 1910; the light blue line during 1912–1917; and the dark brown line during 1918–1932.

Kuomintang Muslim official Tang Kesan was sent to negotiate for an end to the fighting. Ma Xiao was a Muslim brigade commander in Liu Wenhui's army. Muslim General Ma Fuxiang, as head of the Mongolian and Tibetan Affairs Commission, sent a telegraph to Tang Kesan ordering him to breach the agreement with Tibet, because he was concerned that political rivals in Nanjing were using the incident.

Over the next few years the Tibetans repeatedly attacked Liu Wenhui's forces, but were defeated several times. In 1932 Tibet made the decision to expand the war into Qinghai against Ma Bufang, the reasons for which have speculated upon by many historians.

=== Qinghai–Tibet War ===
When the ceasefire negotiated by Tang failed, Tibet expanded the war in 1932, attempting to capture parts of southern Qinghai province following a dispute in Yushu, Qinghai, over a monastery. Ma Bufang saw this as an opportunity to retake Xikang for China. Under Gen. Ma the 9th Division (Kokonor)--composed entirely of Muslim troops—prepared for an offensive against the Tibetans (Kokonor is another name for Qinghai). The war against the Tibetan army was led by the Muslim General Ma Biao.

In 1931 Ma Biao became leader of the Yushu Defense Brigade. He was the second brigade commander while the first brigade was led by Ma Xun. Wang Jiamei was his secretary during the war against Tibet. Ma Biao fought to defend Lesser Surmang against the attacking Tibetans on March 24–26, 1932. The invading Tibetan forces massively outnumbered Ma Biao's defending Qinghai forces. Cai Zuozhen, the local Qinghai Tibetan Buddhist Buqing tribal chief, was fighting on the Qinghai side against the invading Tibetans.

Their forces retreated to the capital of Yushu county, Jiegu, under Ma Biao to defend it against the Tibetans while the Republic of China government under Chiang Kai-shek was petitioned for military aid like wireless telegraphs, money, ammunition and rifles.

A wireless telegraph was sent and solved the communication problem. Ma Xun was sent to reinforce the Qinghai forces and accompanied by propagandists, while mobile films and medical treatment provided by doctors awed the primitive Tibetan locals.

Ma Xun reinforced Jiegu after Ma Biao fought for more than 2 months against the Tibetans. The Tibetan army numbered 3,000. Repeated Tibetan attacks were repulsed by Ma Biao—even though his troops were outnumbered—since the Tibetans were poorly prepared for war, and so they suffered heavier casualties than the Qinghai army. Dud cannon rounds were fired by the Tibetans and their artillery was useless. Ma Lu was sent with more reinforcements to assist Ma Biao and Ma Xun along with La Pingfu. Jiegu's siege was relieved by La Pingfu on August 20, 1932, which freed Ma Biao and Ma Xun's soldiers to assault the Tibetans. Hand-to-hand combat with swords ensued as the Tibetan army was slaughtered by the "Great Sword" group of the Qinghai army in a midnight attack led by Ma Biao and Ma Xun. The Tibetans suffered massive casualties and fled the battlefield as they were routed. The land occupied in Yushu by the Tibetans was retaken.

Both the Tibetan army and Ma Biao's soldiers committed war crimes according to Cai. Tibetan soldiers had raped nuns and women (local Qinghai Tibetans) after looting monasteries and destroying villages in Yushu while Tibetan soldiers who were surrendering and fleeing were summarily executed by Ma Biao's soldiers and supplies were seized from the local nomad civilians by Ma Biao's army.

Ma Biao ordered the religious books, items, and statues of the Tibetan Gadan monastery which had started the war, to be destroyed since he was furious at their role in the war. He ordered the burning of the monastery by the Yushu Tibetan Buddhist chief Cai. But Cai could not bring himself to burn the temple and lied to Biao that the temple had been burned it. Ma Biao seized thousands of silver dollars' worth of items from local nomads as retribution for them assisting the invading Tibetan army. On August 24 and 27, massive artillery duels occurred in Surmang between the Tibetans and Qinghai army. 200 Tibetans soldiers were killed in battle by the Qinghai army after the Tibetans came to reinforce their positions. Greater Surmang was abandoned by the Tibetans as they came under attack by La Pingfu on September 2. In Batang, La Pingfu, Ma Biao, and Ma Xun met Ma Lu's reinforcements on September 20.

Liu Wenhui, the Xikang warlord, had reached an agreement with Ma Bufang and Ma Lin's Qinghai army to strike the Tibetans in Xikang. A coordinated joint Xikang-Qinghai attack against the Tibetan army at Qingke monastery led to a Tibetan retreat from the monastery and the Jinsha river.

The army of Ma Bufang vanquished the Tibetan armies and recaptured several counties in Xikang province, including Shiqu, Dengke and other counties. The Tibetans were pushed back to the other side of the Jinsha River. The Qinghai army recaptured counties that had fallen into the hands of the Tibetan army since 1919. Ma and Liu warned Tibetan officials not to cross the Jinsha River again. Ma Bufang defeated the Tibetans at Dan Chokorgon. Several Tibetan generals surrendered, and were subsequently demoted by the Dalai Lama. By August, the Tibetans had lost so much territory to Liu Wenhui and Ma Bufang's forces that the Dalai Lama telegraphed the British government of India for assistance. British pressure led Nanjing to declare a ceasefire. Separate truces were signed by Ma and Liu with the Tibetans in 1933, ending the fighting. All Tibetan (Kham) territories east of the Yangtse fell into Chinese hands, with the Upper Yangtse River becoming the border between Chinese and Tibetan controlled areas.

The Chinese government and Ma Bufang accused the British of supplying weapons and arms to the Tibetans throughout the war. There was, in fact, a sound basis for that accusation: despite persistent diplomatic efforts encouraging both parties to refrain from hostilities and make a comprehensive settlement, the British also provided military training and small quantities of arms and ammunition to Tibet during the period.

The reputation of the Muslim forces of Ma Bufang was boosted by the war and victory against the Tibetan army. The stature of Ma Biao rose over his role in the war and later in 1937 his battles against the Japanese propelled him to fame nationwide in China. Chinese control of the border areas of Kham and Yushu was guarded by the Qinghai army. Chinese Muslim-run schools used their victory in the war against Tibet to show how they defended China's territorial integrity, which Japan had begun violating in 1937.

A play was written and presented in 1936 to Qinghai's "Islam Progressive Council schools" by Shao Hongsi on the war against Tibet with the part of Ma Biao appearing in the play where he defeated the Tibetans. The play presented Ma Biao and Ma Bufang as heroes who defended Yushu from being lost to the Tibetans and comparing it to the Japanese invasion of Manchuria, saying the Muslims stopped the same scenario from happening in Yushu. Ma Biao and his fight against the Japanese were hailed at the schools of the Islam Progressive Council of Qinghai. The emphasis on military training in schools and their efforts to defend China were emphasized in Kunlun magazine by Muslims. In 1939 his battles against the Japanese led to recognition across China.

== See also ==
- British expedition to Tibet (1903–1904)
- Batang uprising (1905)
- Chinese expedition to Tibet (1910)
- Qinghai–Tibet War (1932)
- Battle of Chamdo (1950)
