= Tang Kesan =

Chinese KMT official

Tang Kesan (Chinese: 唐柯三; pinyin: Táng Kēsān) was a Chinese Muslim. In Xikang province during the Sino-Tibetan War Tang Kesan represented the Kuomintang.

== Career ==
Tang was a Muslim from Shandong province, and he promoted Muslim education. He worked with Muslim General Bai Chongxi. Tang directed the Muslim Chengda School, and was friends with Muslim General Ma Fuxiang.

Tang negotiated a ceasefire with the Tibetans in 1932.

Ma Fuxiang, as head of the Mongolian and Tibetan Affairs Commission, sent a telegraph to Tang Kesan ordering him to breach the agreement with Tibet, because he was concerned that political rivals in Nanjing were using the incident.

The President of the education organization Chinese Islamic National Salvation Federation was General Bai Chongxi (Pai Chung-hsi) and the vice president was Tang Kesan (Tang Ko-san).
