= Ma Biao (general) =

Chinese Muslim Ma Clique General in the National Revolutionary Army

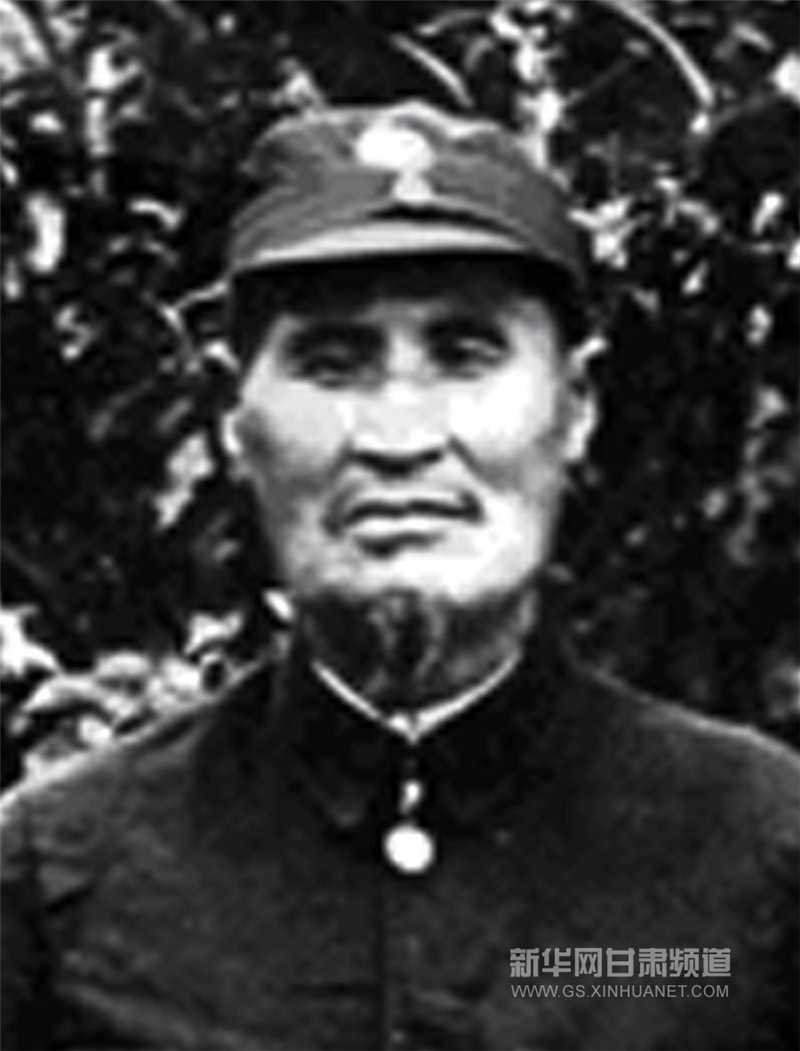
- General Ma Biao
- Born: 1885
- Died: 1948 (aged 62–63); Xining, Qinghai
- Military career
- Allegiance: Qing Empire; Republic of China
- Service years: 1898–1942
- Rank: Lieutenant-General
- Units: Kansu Braves, First Cavalry Division
- Commands: Yushu Defense
- Conflicts: Boxer Rebellion, Sino-Tibetan War, Second Sino-Japanese War, Chinese Civil War

Ma Biao (1885–1948) (traditional Chinese: 馬彪; simplified Chinese: 马彪; pinyin: Mǎ Biāo; Wade–Giles: Ma Piao) was a Chinese Muslim Ma Clique General in the National Revolutionary Army, and served under Ma Bufang, the Governor of Qinghai. A member of the Ma family, Ma Biao was the eldest son of Ma Haiqing 馬海清, who was the sixth younger brother of Ma Haiyan, the grandfather of Ma Bufang.

== Life ==
=== Boxer Rebellion ===
Ma was too young to participate in the First Sino-Japanese War, in which he wanted to fight. He then joined the Kansu Braves, serving under Ma Haiyan, fought against the foreigners in the Boxer Rebellion at the Battle of Peking (1900) and helped guard the Imperial Court when it evacuated to Xi'an.

=== Qinghai-Tibet war ===
He was prominent in the Qinghai – Tibet War, a theater of the Sino-Tibetan War. He was sent by Ma Bufang to create an incident against the Tibetan army at a monastery at Yushu. This set off the Qinghai – Tibet War. In 1931 Ma Biao became leader of the Yushu Defense Brigade. He was the second brigade commander while the first brigade was led by Ma Xun. Wang Jiamei was his secretary during the war against Tibet. Ma Biao fought to defend Lesser Surmang against the attacking Tibetans on 24–26 March 1932. The invading Tibetan forces massively outnumbered Ma Biao's defending Qinghai forces. Cai Zuozhen was fighting on the Qinghai side against the invading Tibetans. The local Qinghai Tibetan Buddhist Buqing tribal chief Cai Zuozhen was on the side of the Qinghai government.

Their forces retreated to the capital of Yushu county, Jiegue, under Ma Biao to defend it against the Tibetans while the Republic of China government under Chiang Kai-shek was petitioned for military aid like wireless telegraphs, money, ammunition and rifles. A wireless telegraph was sent and solved the communication problem. Ma Xun was sent to reinforce the Qinghai forces and accompanied by propagandists while mobile films, and medical treatment provided by doctors to awe the primitive Tibetan locals.Ma Xun reinforced Jiegu after Ma Biao fought for more than two months against the Tibetans. The Tibetan army numbered 3,000. Although the Tibetans outnumbered the Qinghai soldiers the Tibetans suffered more dead in battle than the Qinghai army. Repeated Tibetan attacks were repulsed by Ma Biao even though they outnumbered his army since the Tibetans were poorly prepared for fighting in war. Dud cannon rounds were fired by the Tibetans and their artillery was useless. Ma Lu was sent with more reinforcements to assist Ma Biao and Ma Xun along with La Pingfu. Jiegu's siege was relieved by La Pingfu on 20 August 1932, which freed Ma Biao and Ma Xun's soldiers to destroy the Tibetan army. Hand to hand combat with swords ensued as the Tibetan army was slaughtered by the "Great Sword" group of the Qinghai army during an attack during midnight by Ma Biao and Ma Xun. The Tibetans suffered massive casualties and fled the battlefield as they were routed. The land occupied in Yushu by the Tibetans was retaken.Both the Tibetan army and Ma Biao's soldiers committed war crimes according to Cai. Tibetan soldiers had raped nuns and women (local Qinghai Tibetans) after looting monasteries and destroying villages in Yushu while Tibetan soldiers who were surrendering and fleeing were summarily executed by Ma Biao's soldiers and supplies were seized from the local nomad civilians by Ma Biao's army. Ma Biao ordered the religious books, items, and statues of the Tibetan Gadan monastery which had started the war, to be destroyed since he was furious at their role in the war. He ordered the burning of the monastery by the Yushu Tibetan Buddhist chief Cai. Cai lied that the temple was burned since he could not bring himself to burn it. Ma Biao seized thousands of silver dollars' worth of items from local nomads as retribution for them assisting the invading Tibetan army. On 24 and 27 August, massive artillery duels occurred in Surmang between the Tibetans and Qinghai army. 200 Tibetans soldiers were killed in battle by the Qinghai army after the Tibetans came to reinforce their positions. Greater Surmang was abandoned by the Tibetans as they came under attack by La Pingfu on 2 September. In Batang, La Pingfu, Ma Biao, and Ma Xun met Ma Lu's reinforcements on 20 September.Liu Wenhui, the Xikang warlord, had reached an agreement with Ma Bufang and Ma Lin's Qinghai army to strike the Tibetans in Xikang. A joint Xikang-Qinghai attack against the Tibetan army at Qingke monastery led to a Tibetan retreat from the monastery and the Jinsha river. Xikang army officers were allowed to issue commands to Ma Bufang's Qinghai soldiers by Ma Bufang and telegraphs operated by Liu Wenhui sent messages for Ma Bufang to his soldiers. The reputation of the Muslim forces of Ma Bufang was boosted by the war and victory against the Tibetan army. The stature of Ma Biao rose over his role in the war and later in 1937 his battles against the Japanese propelled him to fame nationwide in China. The control of China over the border area of Kham and Yushu with Tibet was guarded by the Qinghai army. Chinese Muslim run schools used their victory in the war against Tibet to show how they defended the integrity of China's territory as it was put in danger since the Japanese invasion.

He was commander of Yushu Defense Command, Qinghai Province, and he also led the 1st Provisional Cavalry Division, 8th Cavalry Division, 2nd Cavalry Army, and served on the Military Advisory Council.

=== Second Sino-Japanese war ===
Ma Biao participated in encirclement campaigns against the Communists.

He fought in the Second Sino-Japanese War and in the Chinese Civil War. His rank was Lieutenant-General. Immediately after the Marco Polo Bridge Incident, Ma Bufang arranged for a cavalry division under Muslim General Ma Lu 馬祿 and another cavalry division under Ma Biao to be sent east to battle the Japanese. Ethnic Turkic Salar Muslims made up the majority of the first cavalry division which was sent by Ma Bufang.

A play was written and present in 1936 to Qinghai's "Islam Progressive Council schools" by Shao Hongsi on the war against Tibet with the part of Ma Biao appearing in the play where he defeated the Tibetans. The play presented Ma Biao and Ma Bufang as heroes who defended Yushu from being lost to the Tibetans and comparing it to the Japanese invasion of Manchuria, saying the Muslims stopped the same scenario from happening in Yushu. Ma Biao and his fight against the Japanese were hailed at the schools of the Islam Progressive Council of Qinghai. The emphasis on military training in schools and their efforts to defend China were emphasized in Kunlun magazine by Muslims. In 1939 his battles against the Japanese led to recognition across China.

I am eager to stomp on the dwarf devils (A derogatory term for Japanese), I will give vengeance for the already dead martyrs, achieving glory with the younger generation." said by Ma Biao with reference to his service in the Boxer Rebellion where he already fought the Japanese before World War II.By the time of World War II he had been in the military for over 40 years, and his service in World War II against the Japanese was regarded as the pinnacle of his achievements by himself.

Ma Biao crushed the Japanese at the Battle of Huaiyang.

Ma Bufang's army battled extensively in bloody battles against the Japanese in Henan province and fought against White Lotus elements who had allied with the Japanese. The Qinghai Chinese, Salar, Chinese Muslim, Dongxiang, and Tibetan troops were under the commander of Ma Biao, being sent to fight to the death against the Imperial Japanese Army, or committed suicide refusing to be taken prisoner. When they defeated the Japanese, the Muslim troops slaughtered all of them except for a few prisoners to send back to Qinghai prove that they were victorious. In September 1940, when the Japanese made an offensive against the Muslim Qinghai troops, the Muslims ambushed them and killed so many of them they were forced to retreat. The Japanese could not even pick up their dead, they instead cut an arm from their corpses limbs for cremation to send back to Japan. The Japanese did not dare make an offensive like that again.

During World War II, the China Information Publishing Company included an article on Ma Biao in Volume 4 of its publication "China at War", which discussed both his service in the Boxer Rebellion in 1900 and his fight against the Japanese in World War II in Henan. According to the article, he knew four languages: an indigenous dialect, Tibetan, Arabic, and Chinese. Tibetan Lamaists (Tibetan Buddhists) made up 20% of his soldiers, Han Chinese made up 30% of his soldiers, and various Muslim ethnicities made up the remaining 50%. He had a beard.

Ma Biao was forced to retire and leave the battlefield with great reluctance. Ma Biao's relative Ma Bukang succeeded him as 8th Cavalry Division commander in the summer of 1942 and proceeded to battle the Japanese.

Ma Biao died at age 63 due to a car accident in Xining.
