= Wang Jingzhai =

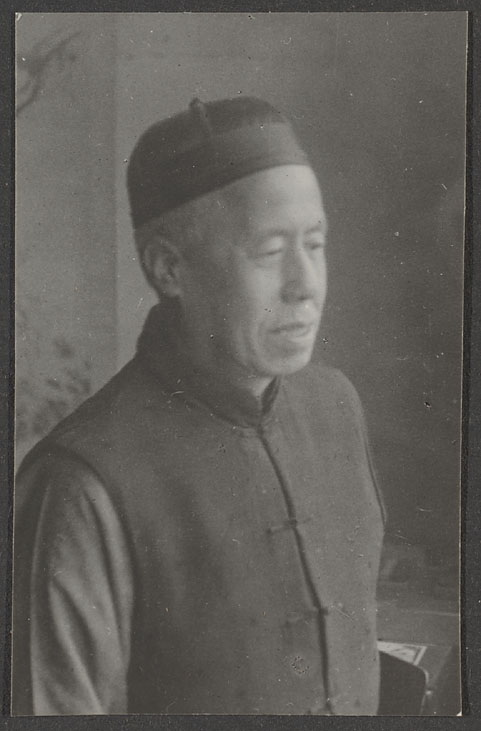
Portrait of Wang Jingzhai.

Wang Jingzhai (traditional Chinese: 王靜齋; simplified Chinese: 王静斋; pinyin: Wáng Jìngzhāi; 1879 - 1949) was a well-known Muslim scholar during the Republic of China period. He was the first or possibly second person to translate the entire Qur'an into Chinese, in either 1927 or 1932. He began the translation due to a request from the son of female Chinese Muslim scholar Ding Yunhui. Yunhui had written the Omudai, a partial translation of the Qur'an which omitted any references to Islamic sexual jurisprudence due to the prevailing sensitivities in women's mosques in China at the time.

== Biography ==
Wang Jingzhai hailed from a family of learned imams from Tianjin. At an early age, Wang's father begin teaching him about Islamic and Confucian scholarship. In his mid-twenties, Wang served as an imam in numerous mosques in northeastern China. Later on, Wang performed the hajj and then attended Al-Azhar University, where he gained fluency in Arabic. Once back in China, Wang produced his famous Chinese translation of the Quran. During the Republican era, Wang founded several religious periodicals advocating for Chinese Muslims to fully participate in the construction and upkeep of the nation.
