= Hodruša Reservoir =

Reservoir in Slovakia

Coordinates: 48°27′51″N 18°51′04″E

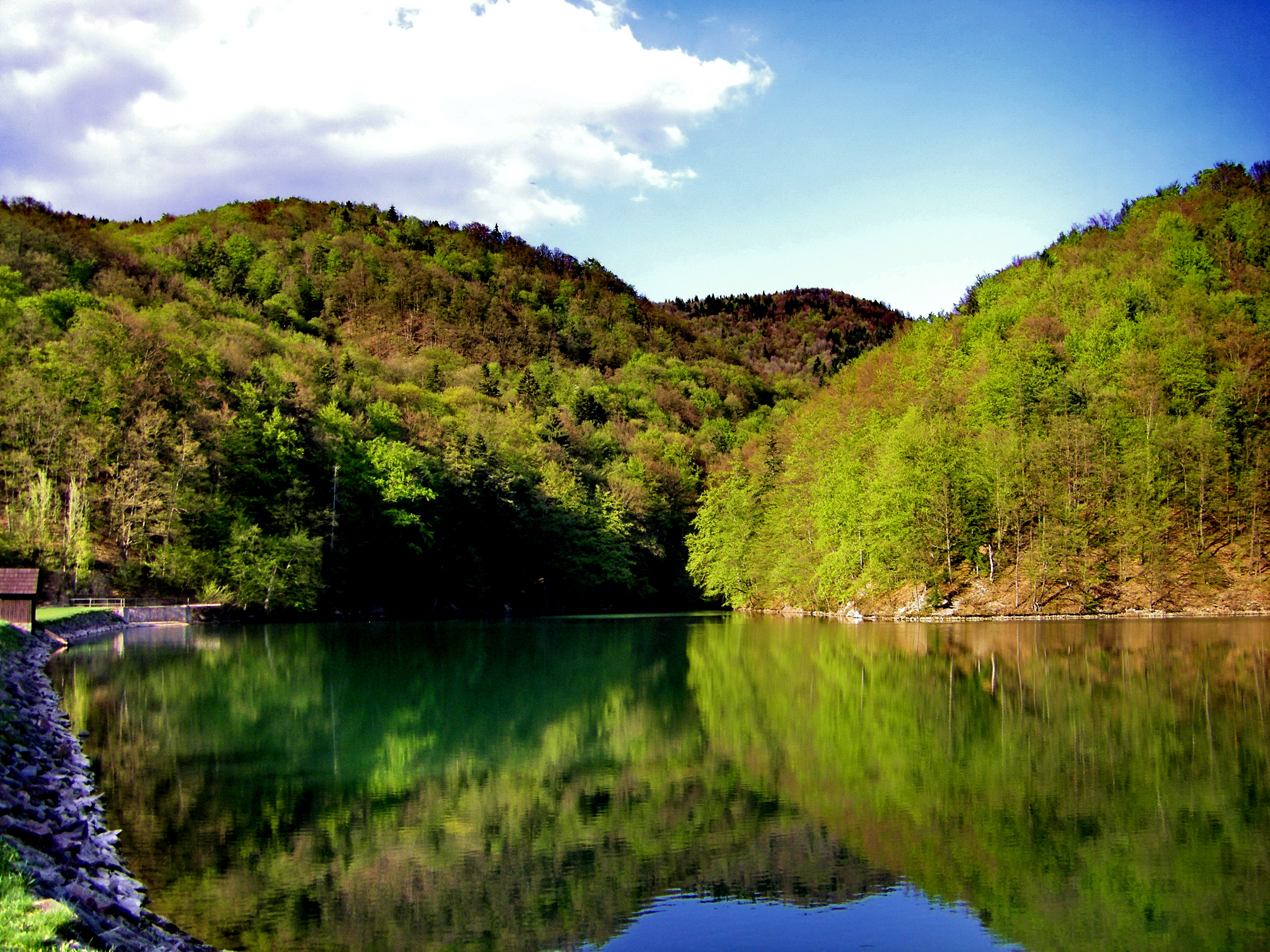
The Hodruša Reservoir

Hodruša Reservoir (Slovak: Hodrušské jazero; also known as: Dolné Hodrušské jazero, Dolnohodrušské jazero, Dolnohodrušský tajch, Dolný Hodrušský tajchy) is a tajchy in the Štiavnické vrchy mountain range in the cadastral area of the village Hodruša-Hámre. Registered as one of the objects on the UNESCO World Cultural Heritage List within the Banská Štiavnica and its surroundings area.

== History ==
The lake was created for the needs of Hodruša's mining, metallurgical, and processing activities after complaints about the decreasing flow of Hodrušský potok due to the diversion of rainwater from the Pohronie watershed to the Povodie Ipľa watershed via a channel system supplying the Vindšacht and Richňava tajches. Originally, an upgrade and enlargement of the Horný Hodrušský tajch was planned for these purposes. On 7 June 1743, an inspection of the condition was conducted for these purposes by Sámuel Mikoviny with adjunct Matej Zipser. Zipser convinced Mikovíny of the need to build a new, larger lake. The project was prepared promptly by Mikovíny, and preparations for construction began in the same month. A year later, the dam was already 14 meters high, but due to lack of funds, work was halted, and the tajch was put into operation. Simultaneously, reconstruction of the Horný Hodrušský tajch took place. The raising of the Dolný tajch dam by 9 meters to the designed water level was only completed in 1786. The lake was repaired several times, with failures in the outlet device occurring in 1786, and in 1960 repairs were made to the water spillway, while the dam tends to settle, which was addressed by additions and repairs in 1824, 1966, and 2008.

== Recent years ==
Currently, the lake is managed by the Slovak Water Management Enterprise, its Povodie Hrona division. Until 1981, it was owned by Rudné bane š.p. Banská Bystrica. Its waters still supply the operational Slovenská Banská processing plant in Hodruša-Hámre, which extracts and processes gemstone and polymetallic ores at the Rozália mine. The lake is a popular spot for relaxation and swimming for locals and tourists from the wider area. Since the end of the 1960s, it has not undergone a major reconstruction – a planned reconstruction began in September 2013 and was to last 20 months. Hundreds of thousands of euros from EU funds were allocated for the reconstruction, but subsequent unexpected repairs cost more than two million euros from the state budget. The lake was refilled only in spring 2021.

== Technical parameters ==
- Dam crest elevation: 528 m
- Above sea level volume: 641,000 m³
- Water area: 4.33 ha
- Dam crest length: 199 m
- Dam crest width: max. 5.7 m
- Dam height: 22 m
- Maximum depth: 21 m

== Sources ==
- Sborník konference Slovenského vodohospodářského podniku Štiavnické Bane 2003 in Zpravodaj p.2-4 / 2003 Vyd.Bevex Prievidza
- Lichner Marián Banská Štiavnica, svědectví času, Harmony, Banská Bystrica, 2002
- Průvodce po technických památkách Banské Štiavnice a okolí, Harmony, Banská Bystrica, 2004
