= József Károly Hell =

Hungarian mining engineer (1713–1789)

József Károly Hell (Slovak: Jozef Karol Hell, German: Josef/ph Karl Hell, Hungarian: Hell József Károly) (15 May 1713, Szélakna (Windschacht, Piarg, now Štiavnické Bane, Slovakia) – 11 March 1789, Selmecbánya (Schemnitz, now Banská Štiavnica, Slovakia) was a Hungarian mining engineer and inventor, who invented the water-pillar (water pump machine) in 1749 (first use 1753). It is mainly used today for oil extraction. He also proposed construction of the tajchy reservoirs around Selmecbánya. He was a student of Sámuel Mikoviny in 1737. Regardless of his nationality, he is a pride of both Hungarian and Slovak nations.

His first machine was able to pump water up from the depth of 212 meters. Hell later built pumping machines in 1749-1768, which belonged to the best technology in this field worldwide.
