= Tajchy =

Artificial reservoir in Slovakia

Coordinates: 48.4611°N 18.9000°E

Tajchy (singular: tajch, from German Teich) are artificial water reservoirs in the Štiavnica Mountains, in central Slovakia. Most of them were built in order to provide energy for the silver mines of Banská Štiavnica in the 18th century. At their height, tajchy comprised a sophisticated system of 60 reservoirs, connected to each other by more than 100 km of channels and tunnels.

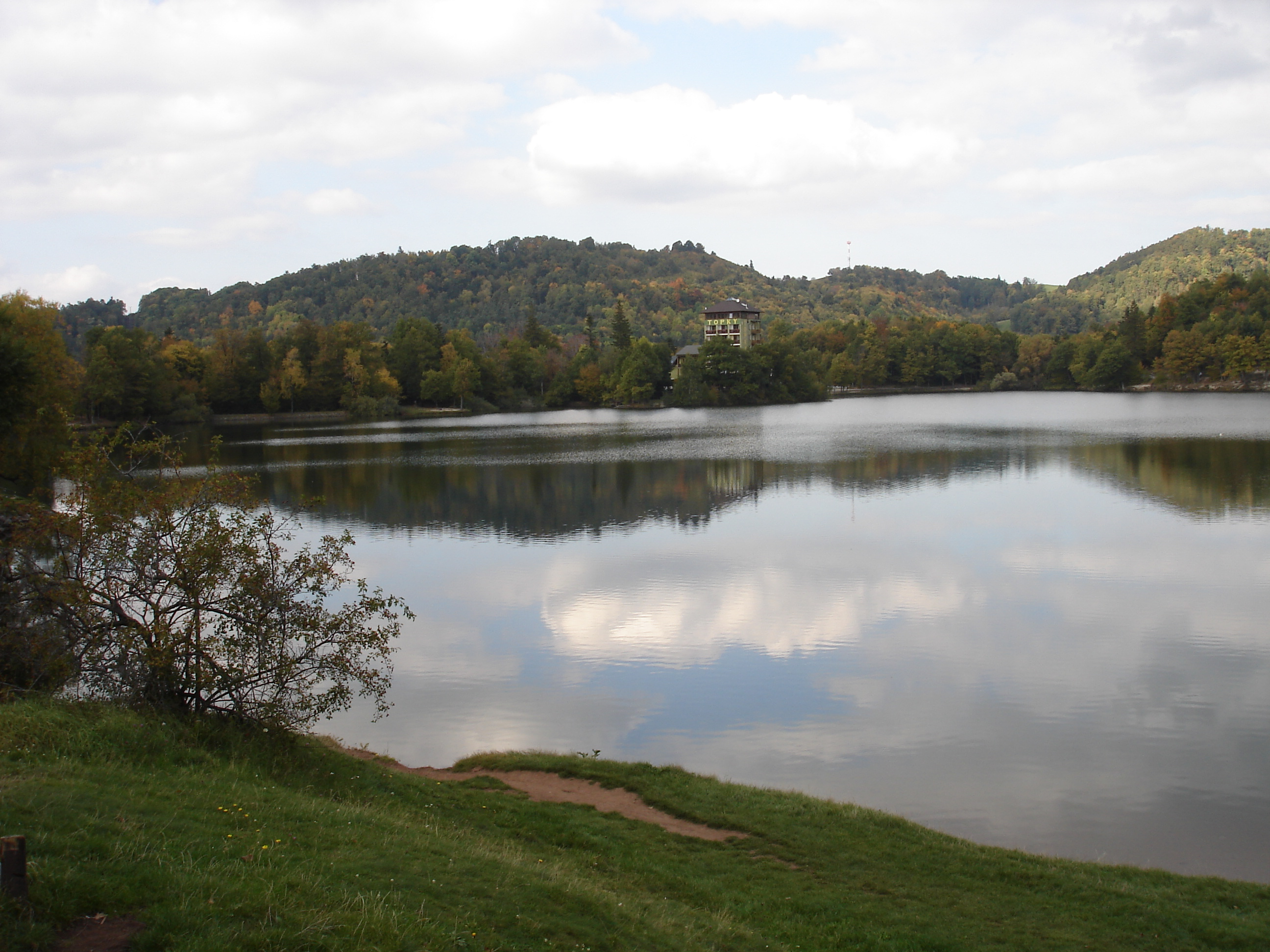
Počúvadlo Lake is one of the preserved tajchy

24 artificial lakes still exist and serve recreational purposes. Because of their historical value, tajchy were proclaimed by the UNESCO to be a World Heritage Site on 11 December 1993, together with the town of Banská Štiavnica and technical historical monuments in its surroundings.

== Operation ==
The region of Banská Štiavnica lacks significant sources of flowing surface water. That is why tajchy were designed to store water derived from precipitation. Channels with the overall length of 72 km diverted water from the rain and melting snow to sixty reservoirs. The whole system could accumulate 7 million m^{3} of water. The water then flowed through 57 km of channels to water wheels, which powered seven pumps equipped with a pendulum-action system. The pumps removed excess groundwater from mines and the water wheels later also provided energy for mining, processing, metallurgy, and mills.

== History ==
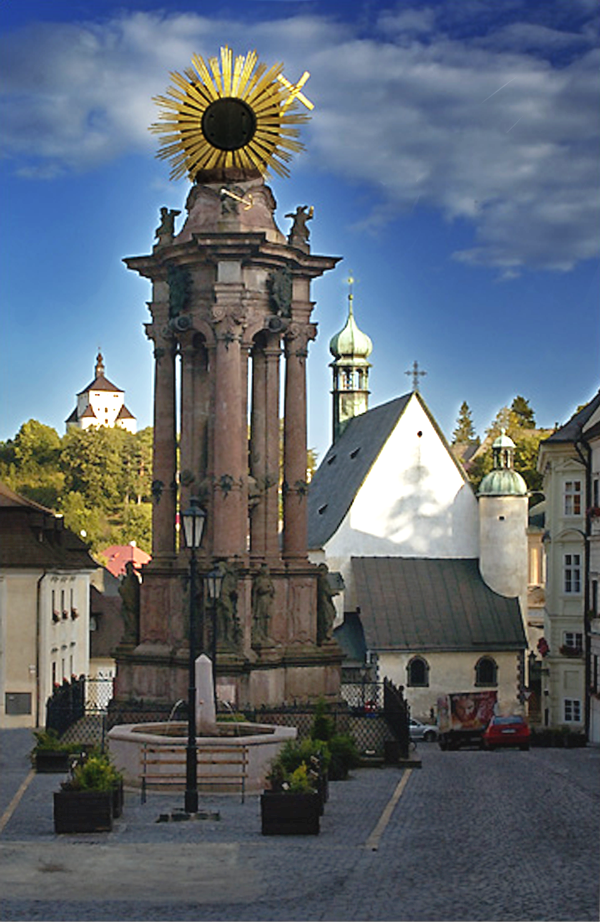
Tajchy became crucial for the development of Banská Štiavnica

Banská Štiavnica was an important medieval mining center, producing mostly silver. The first water reservoirs were founded by the local miners in the 15th century. However, the most significant development of tajchy was precipitated by a crisis in the mining industry in the 17th century. The depth of the mines' shafts started to reach below the level of the drainage tunnels. As a result, mines were flooded by ground water. The draining mechanisms of that period were powered by human or animal power, which was too expensive. Due to the prohibitive costs, the Royal Court Chamber in Vienna decided to close the mines in Banská Štiavnica and its surroundings. A mining expert and inventor Jozef Karol Hell challenged the decision, submitting a courageous proposal to rescue mining in his home town. An innovative plan based on the use of tajchy was finally endorsed by Emperor Charles VI.

In the 18th century, tajchy gradually expanded into a complicated system of lakes and channels, designed by three famous engineers: Jozef Karol Hell, his father Matej Kornel Hell, and especially Jozef's teacher Samuel Mikovíny. The project was technically and economically demanding. For example, construction of two Richňava tajchy required the work of 4,000 people working every day for three years (1738–1740). But after their completion, tajchy proved capable of draining all the water from the flooded mines and they even provided enough energy for other booming industries.

The renewed prosperity resulted in great economic and cultural development of Banská Štiavnica. In 1782, Banská Štiavnica (Selmecbánya) was the third biggest town in the Kingdom of Hungary (with 23,192 or including suburbs 40,000 inhabitants), after Bratislava (Pozsony) and Debrecen. In 1762, Queen Maria Theresa ordered the establishment of a Mining Academy in Banská Štiavnica, creating the first technical university in the world. The town was chosen "because it had mining, hydrological, metallurgical, propulsion, and testing equipment as well as fire, water and air devices, and pendulum-action drainage devices which did not exist in other mining locations," in other words because of its tajchy. Tajchy were also praised by their royal visitors, including Francis I, Joseph II, and Leopold II.

== Water reservoirs ==
Until the mid-19th century, the three tallest dams in Europe built for the mining industry had been tajchy in Slovakia: Rozgrund (30.2 m), Počúvadlo (29.6 m), and Veľká Richňava (23.4 m). In the same period, 7 out of 13 European mining water reservoirs with the biggest volume of water were tajchy. After several centuries, tajchy became an integral part of their natural environment. Several of the dams have been recently reconstructed. Some of the reservoirs are heavily frequented by tourists, while other, usually smaller lakes lie hidden in the forests of the Štiavnica Mountains.

The largest lake is Počúvadeľské jazero (or Počúvadlo) with an area of 12.13 hectares and a depth of 11 m. The volume is 745,000 m^{3}. The main dam is 195 m long and 19 m thick. Tourist infrastructure makes Počúvadlo the most popular of all tajchy.

Veľká Richňavská nádrž (or Veľká Richňava) has a dam 569 m long, 23.4 m high, and 23 m thick. This tajch is characterized by the largest depth (21 m) and volume (960,000 m^{3}). It supplies Štiavnické Bane with water and also serves for recreation.

Rozgrund was the highest earthen dam in Czechoslovakia until the second half of the 20th century. The reservoir supplies the town of Banská Štiavnica with drinking water.

=== List of all preserved reservoirs ===
- Bakomi reservoir in Štiavnické Bane
- Belianske reservoir in Banská Belá
- Červená studňa reservoir in Banská Štiavnica
- Evička reservoir in Štiavnické Bane
- Goldfuss reservoir in Banská Belá
- Halčianske reservoir in Banská Belá
- Klinger reservoir in Banská Štiavnica
- Kolpašsky small reservoir in Banský Studenec
- Kolpašsky big reservoir in Banský Studenec
- Krechsengrund reservoir in Štiavnické Bane
- Kysihyblianské reservoirs in Banský Studenec
- Lintich reservoir (destroyed) in Banská Štiavnica
- Michalstolniansky reservoir in Banská Štiavnica
- Moderstolna reservoir in Kopanice
- Ottergrund reservoir in Banská Štiavnica
- Počúvadlo reservoir in Počúvadlo
- Rozgrund reservoir in Banská Štiavnica
- Richňavské velke jazero in Štiavnické Bane
- Richňava small reservoir in Štiavnické Bane
- Štampoch reservoir in Vysoká
- Vindšachta big reservoir in Štiavnické Bane
- Vodárenska big reservoir in Banská Štiavnica
- Vodárenska small reservoir in Banská Štiavnica
- Hodrusa upper reservoir in Banská Hodruša
- Hodrusa lower reservoir in Banská Hodrusa
- Komorovske upper and lower reservoirs in Banská Štiavnica
- Banky reservoir in Banská Štiavnica
