= Kalvária Banská Štiavnica =

UNESCO World Heritage Site
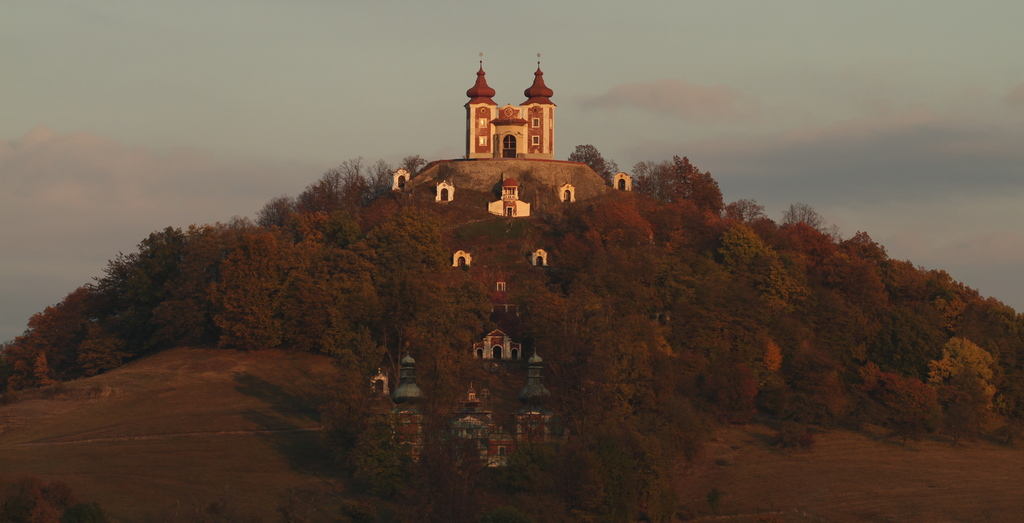

- Location within Banská Bystrica Region Location within Slovakia
- Location: Banská Štiavnica, Banská Štiavnica District, Banská Bystrica Region, Slovakia
- Part of: Historic Town of Banská Štiavnica and the Technical Monuments in its Vicinity
- Criteria: Cultural: (iv)(v)
- Reference: 618rev
- Inscription: 1993 (17th Session)
- Coordinates: 48°27′40″N 18°54′50″E

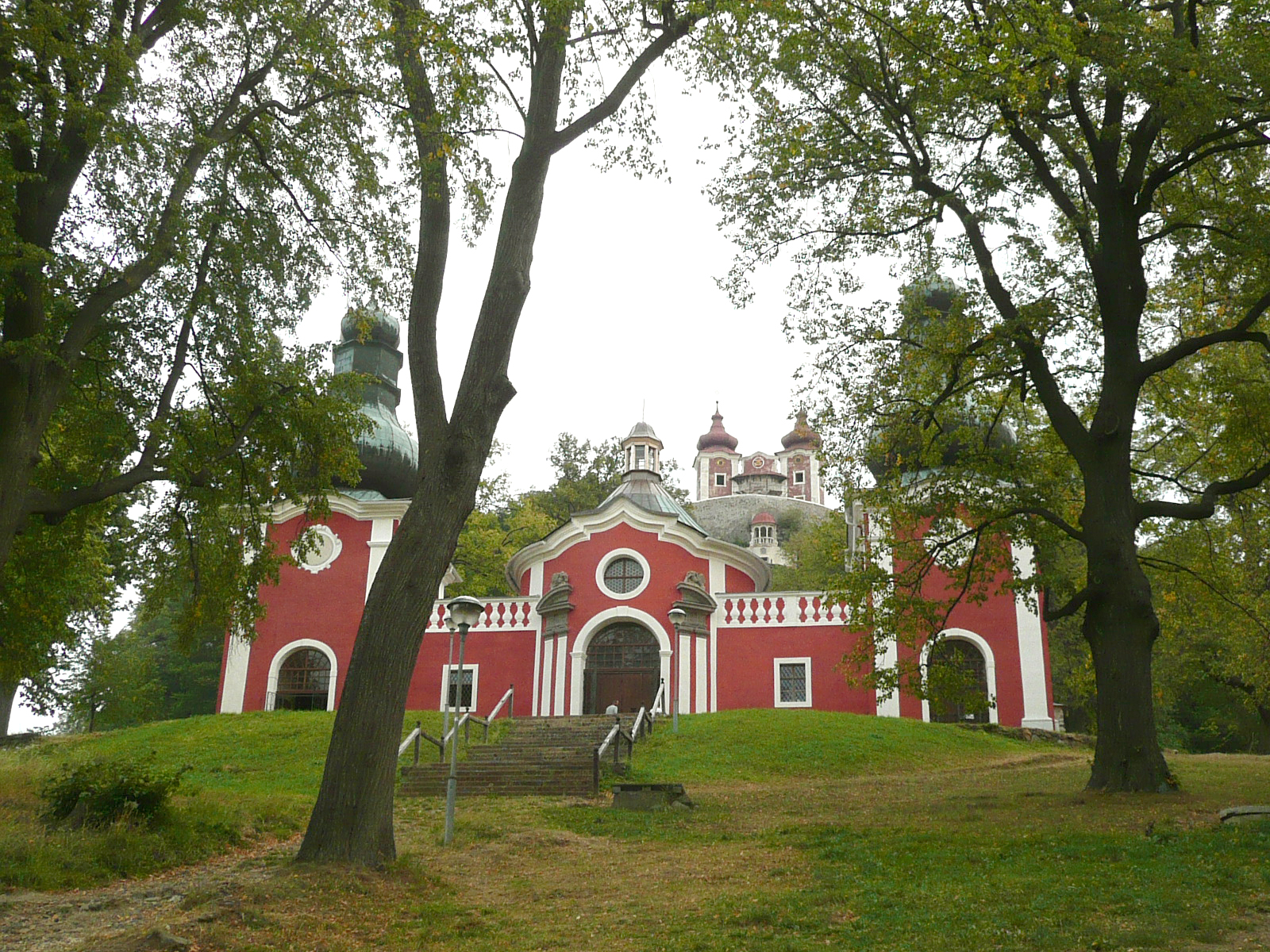
The lower church in 2012

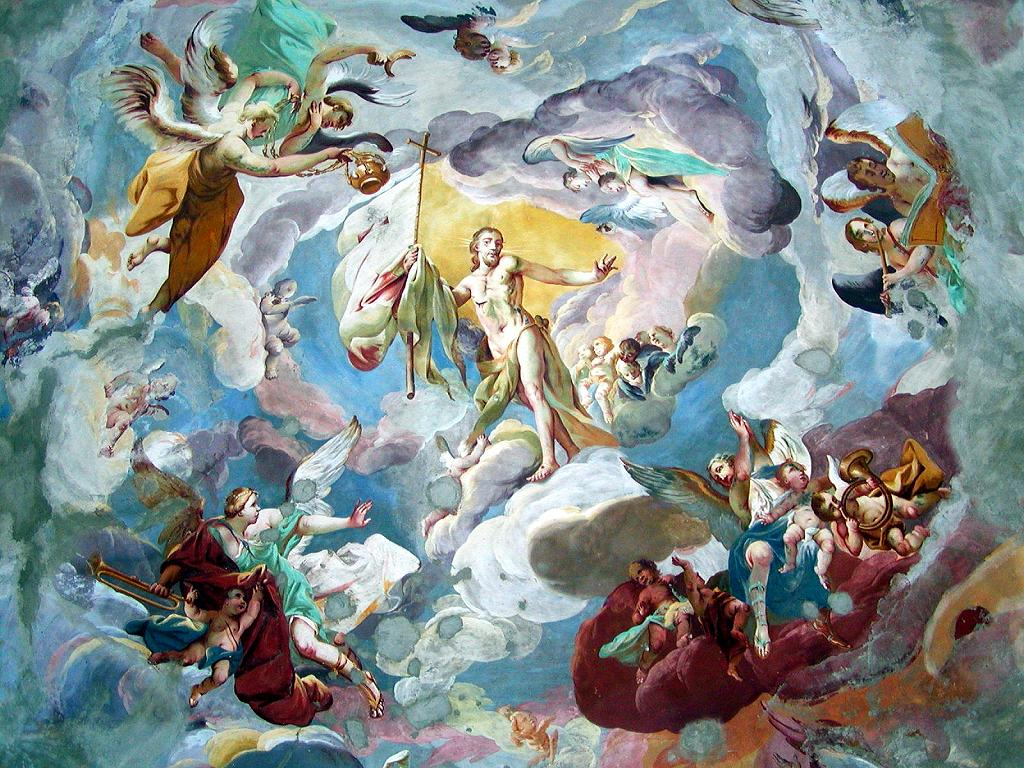
Anton Schmidt : Fresco – paintings of the upper church of Calvary

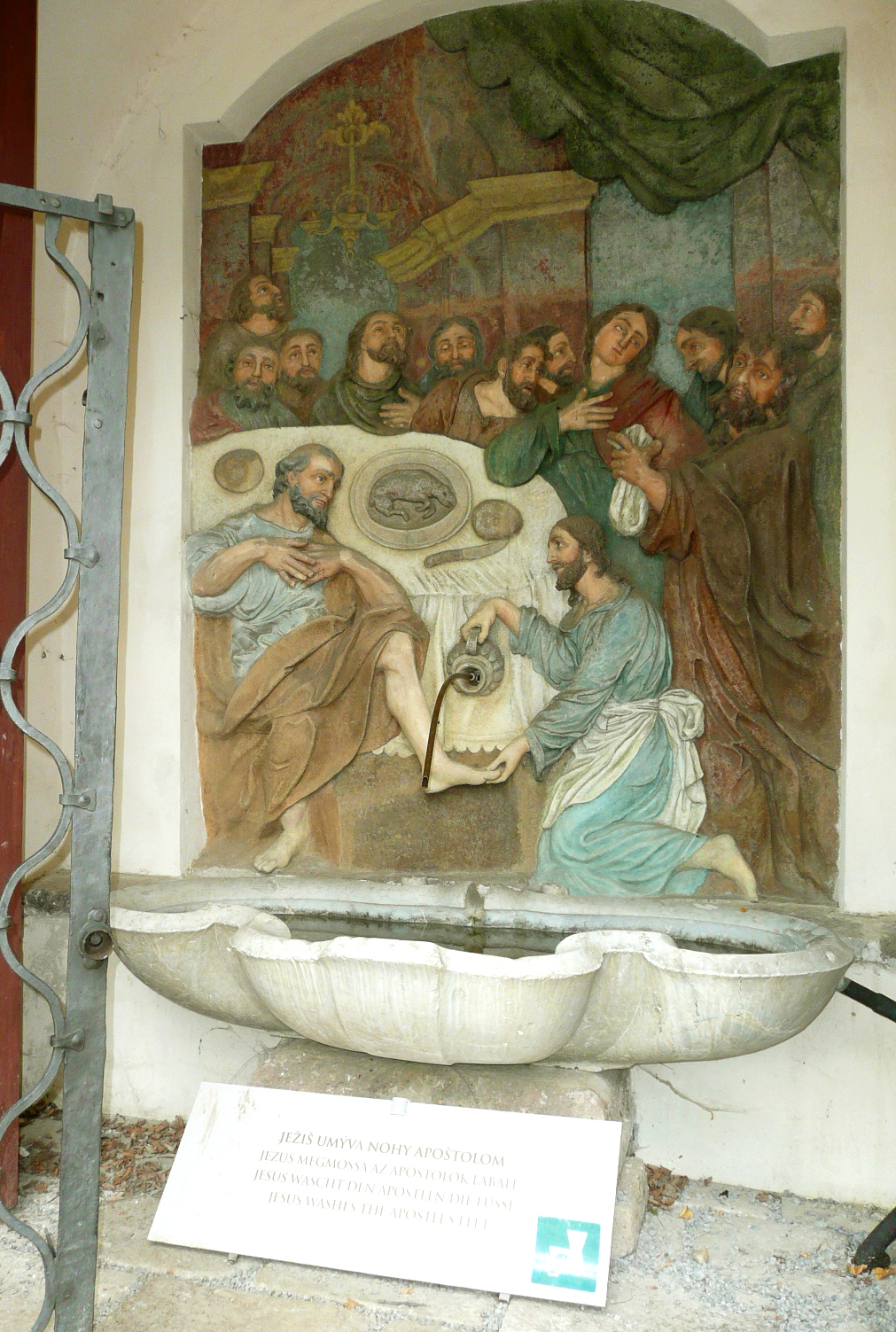
A chapel in 2012

Calvary Banská Štiavnica (Slovak: Banskoštiavnická Kalvária) is a late-Baroque calvary, architectural and landscape unit in Slovakia, unique in extent and content, formed in the years 1744–1751.

== Characteristics ==
Calvary Banská Štiavnica is the most important Baroque calvary in Slovakia and in the whole former Kingdom of Hungary – probably even in the whole of Europe. This calvary is a complex of 3 churches and 22 chapels with precious painting decorations, furnished by wooden and blacksmith movables and wooden painted reliefs. All buildings of churches and chapels are set into the western side of a solid lava column in the middle of an ancient volcano – a hill named Scharffenberg (Slovak: Ostrý vrch). The work was initiated by Jesuits in the 18th century as a part of their large programme implemented across the country.

== Formation ==
Around 1740, medieval city Schemnitz, Kingdom of Hungary (now Banská Štiavnica, Slovakia) intended to form a standard Calvary with fourteen stations in the eastern part of the city – under a hill named Ostrý vrch (Scharffenberg – this hill along with the surrounding land belonged to the family of Fritz von Friedenlieb, of Protestant religion). However, only two chapels still remain standing. The Jesuit Father František Perger proposed to the City Hall a project of magnificent Calvary comprising three churches and 22 chapels, probably based on the architectural design of major historian, cartographer and architect Samuel Mikoviny. The owners of the land in the year 1744 released the top of the hill with its western slope to the city in order to allow implementation of the Calvary complex as proposed by the Father Perger. After considering, the magistrate finally on 13 March 1744 agreed to, and provided the initial funding by the sum of 300 Goldens. Municipality Banská Štiavnica presented on 22 May 1744 a demand to ecclesiastical authority for approval to build Calvary according to this project under the auspices of the city of Banská Štiavnica. Archbishop of Esztergom (resident in Trnava) Imrich Esterházy (1725–1745) adopted the request and his approval reached the municipality on 13 August 1744. Immediately preparation work was begun – treatments of the ground and import of materials on the site. The cornerstone was solemnly blessed by the presence of large numbers of believers and the priesthood on the Feast of Exaltation of the holy Cross – on 14 September in 1744. The first building was the "Upper Church".

All works have been directed by the creator of the idea – the Jesuit Father Francis Perger S.J. Local masons, carpenters, stonemasons, woodcarvers worked there as well as painters and other professionals. The wooden reliefs from Calvary chapels and wood carvings from the Upper church are attributed to the workshop of Dionysius Stanetti (1710–1767), a major baroque sculptor, established in the city of Kremnica. The upper church has been painted by Austrian baroque painter Mr. Anton Schmidt, born and graduated in Vienna, settled in the city of Banská Štiavnica. Before completion of works, they started pilgrimages to the Calvary hill Banská Štiavnica. On 14 September 1745, the Upper Church has been solemnly blessed and the first holy Mass took place there, visited by pilgrims who came out of the city in a procession with flags. Also in 1746, on the Feast of the Finding and Exaltation of the holy Cross, processions came to Calvary. That year, they finished the Holy Sepulchre – chapel and the lower church of the calvary. Even after these years, in spite of continuing works of construction and equipment of churches and chapels, pilgrims came on 14 September, not only from Štiavnica, but also from the environment.

On the Feast of the Holy Trinity in 1751, they visited the calvary prominent guests, among them the Emperor Francis of Lorraine. The whole Calvary complex of Banská Štiavnica was built and churches and chapels equipped in less than seven years. The ceremonial blessing took place on 14 September 1751. The festive mass was preached in the Germanic and Slovak languages, the Germanic sermon given by the popular father Francis Perger.

Total costs of Calvary Banská Štiavnica reached 25 899 Golds (not counting the labor of generous believers who worked on this work willingly for free).

Records mention several physical healings for Štiavnica Calvary.

== History and reconstructions ==
In 1894, some chapels have been repaired and restored by the architect Mr. William J. Groszmann and carver Mr. Krause from Banská Štiavnica.

Serious damages to Calvary complex were caused during WW II. in 1945 when the Red army pushed fascist troops out from the city. Efforts to reconstruct Calvary began after 1953, when chaplain Emil Scheimer, a native of Banska Hodruša, later canon of Topoľčianky, started to mobilise the reconstruction works in person. The largest maintenance, renewal and partial restoration work was done between 1978–1981, under the parish administrator Father Karol Beňovic, SVD. The three lowest chapels were moved higher into the slope of Calvary and they began with restoration works.

The state of the Calvary in the first decade of the 21st century was marked by the passing of time, but it also became the victim of vandalism and theft of the art decor and furnishings. The Calvary has been scarred not only by the ravages of time, but also by human negligence and malice. Some of the moveable artistic decoration was stolen, some has been targeted by vandals. The extent of the cultural and historic losses in the period 1989-2004 is incalculable. After the last destructive attack of vandals in the spring of 2004, the original elements of the decoration of Calvary (wood reliefs and sculptures) have been gradually moved into safety. This became the impetus for organizing the exhibition „Calvary in Asylum“. Calvary chapels and churches were deprived of original furniture by moving of the original reliefs and sculptures, but it was essential for their conservation. In early 2007, conservationists managed to enter this complex on the World Monument Fund’s list of the 100 most endangered monuments in the world. This provided an important catalyst for action to prevent further devastation of the Calvary, and to take steps to restore and rescue the most vulnerable parts of the original.

Restoration, preservation and revitalization of Calvary Banská Štiavnica is provided from the beginning of 2008 by the civic association „The Calvary Fund“, that after more than a half century built on the good experience of structure with the same name, operating since the establishment of Calvary Banská Štiavnica until its suspension by the communist regime after World War II. After complete restoration of the Lower Church in 2013, restoration of 18 chapels, the revitalization of the whole area, the Upper Church was completed on 12 October 2018, which ended the main phase of the reconstruction.

The restoration works are currently focused on renovation of the Holy stairs (the Middle church) and Chapel of Jesus´Tomb as well as gradual completion of the sculptural decoration of damaged or stolen statues. The original construction of Calvary was made possible thanks to the donors who decided to financially support its construction, or participate with their own efforts. And now its reconstruction and restoration is being made possible thanks to massive support from sponsors – corporations, private companies, Ministry of Culture of the Slovak Republic and private individuals – and also thanks to the help of many volunteers.

The main work done during the years 2008 – 2018

– Complete restoration of the Lower Church: restoration of facades, frescoes, altars and relief of The Last Supper, installation of infrastructure and technical facilities, repair of the roof, stairs, tiles, doors and gratings

– Building of a natural amphitheatre behind the Lower Church

– Electrification of the area, sewage system, opening of the exhibition in the Lower church

– Recovery of most chapels, restoration of the chapel Ecce Homo

– Complete reconstruction of the sculpture The Virgin Mary

– Revitalisation of green areas, treatment of the alley, partial repair of the path, walls and stairs

– Complete restoration of the Upper Church: restoration of facades, frescoes, altar, roofs, lookout tower, portal and statues of 3 crucified and building of security system

– Building of the new Infocenter at the base of the Calvary

– Launch of the evening lighting for the Upper church and several chapels

– Gradual completion of sculptural decoration

– Publication of the guide Pilgrimage through the Calvary of Banská Štiavnica

The Calvary is again a very popular touristic site. Its visited by 70,000 visitors annually, there are regular pilgrimages and holy masses, as well as other cultural events. It is accessible the entire year for free. During the opening hours you can visit the exhibition in the infocenter and exhibition Calvary in Assylum as well or contact the Calvary fund to organise a guided tour.

== Gallery ==
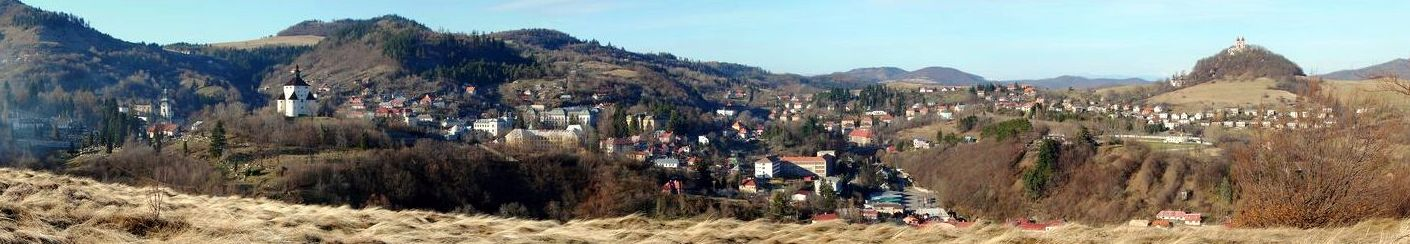
Panorama of Banská Štiavnica with Calvary in the background.

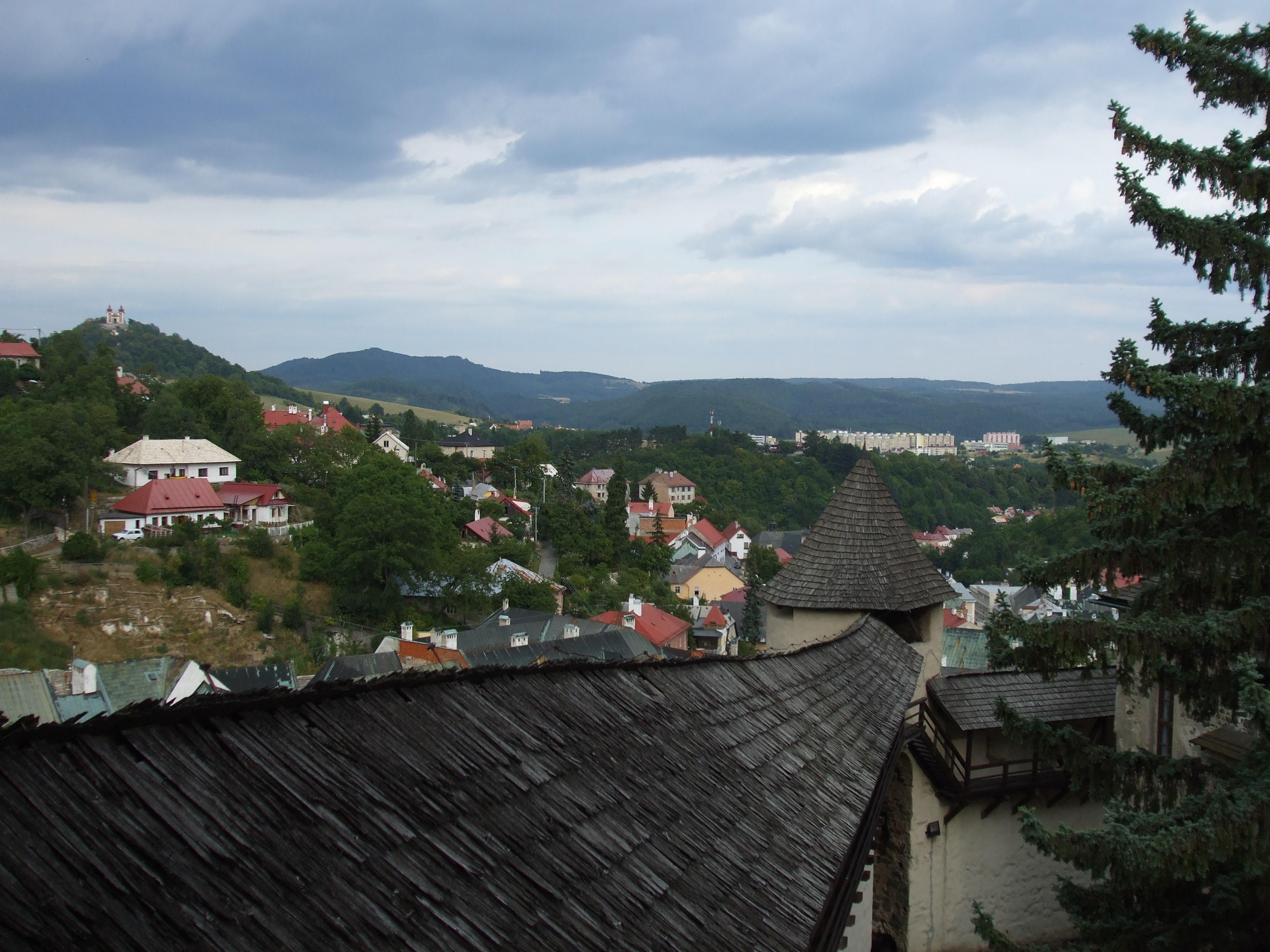
Look of Calvary from the Old Castel
