= St. Catherine's Church, Banská Štiavnica, Slovakia =

Coordinates: 48.4590°N 18.8926°E

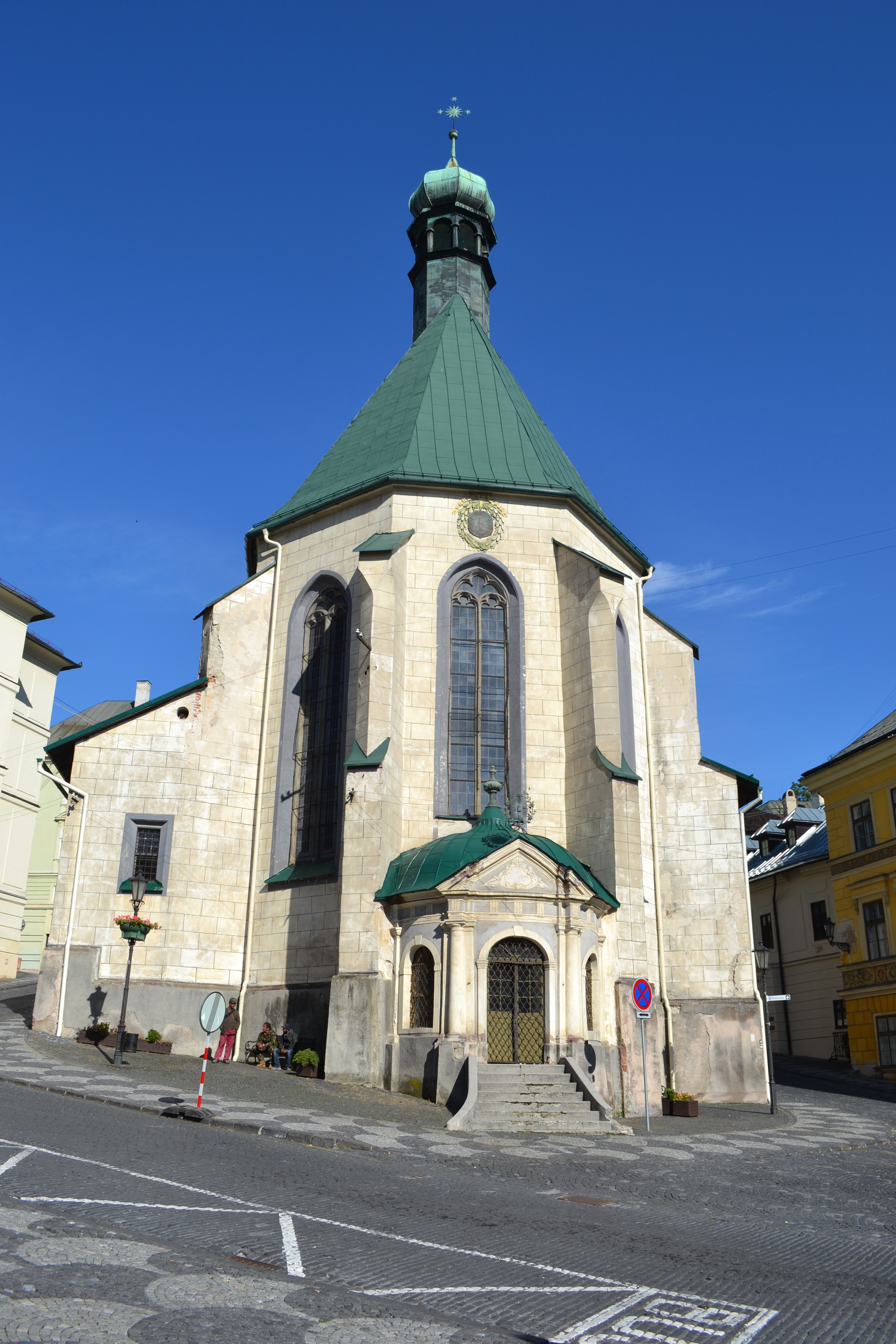
St. Catherine's Church

St. Catherine's Church is a Late Gothic church in the town in Banska Stiavnica, Slovakia. It is dedicated to Saint Catherine of Alexandria.

The construction is dated between years 1488 and 1491 and the church was consecrated in 1500. Fifty years later it was promoted to the status of a parish church. The year 1491 is stated also as the year when the church was established. Older resources indicate that the construction began in 1443 or 1444, what corresponds to time, when citizens of Banska Stiavnica moved to the area of nowadays town, after the old town was destroyed. From 1580 to 1675, during the period of the Reformation, it belonged to the Lutheran church. In 1658 mass began to be preached in Slovak, which is why it is called "the Slovak church."

== Investors ==
Wealthy families of mining entrepreneurs, owners of the houses located on the main Holy Trinity Square were the most probable investors in the St. Catherine's Church.

== Position ==
The church is located on the quite steep slope of the brink on the lower part of Holy Trinity Square at the intersection of the main roads of Banska Stiavnica. It has a northwest–southeast orientation. It has a dominant location directly in the city center, at the crossroads of two most significant medieval roads; nowadays there is a conjunction of Holy Trinity Square and Andrej Kmet street.

== Disposition ==
The church is a Late Gothic single nave space. The polygonal chapel is merging with the aisle and western chorus. Characteristic Late Gothic buttress pillars incorporate inside the composition. Between the pillars, on the northern side of the nave, are embedded three Gothic chapels. From the main space, next to the presbytery, exite a sacristy. Storeyed space in the South-Western corner of the nave was in the lower part also used as a chapel. Upstairs it extends chorus itself, allowing access directly from the outside. It has barrel vaults ended with lunettes. Beneath the church, there is a crypt, where majors and important burgesses where buried. An original entrance portal is located on the western facade of the church. In the upper corners are figural cantilevers. There is a painted town blazon above the portal with the year 1555 (when the church was turned into parish). In the last quarter of the 18th century the Baroque chapel of St. John of Nepomucene was added to the church. Its pastel violet colour sets the chapel off like a little jewel against the monumental grey walls of the church.

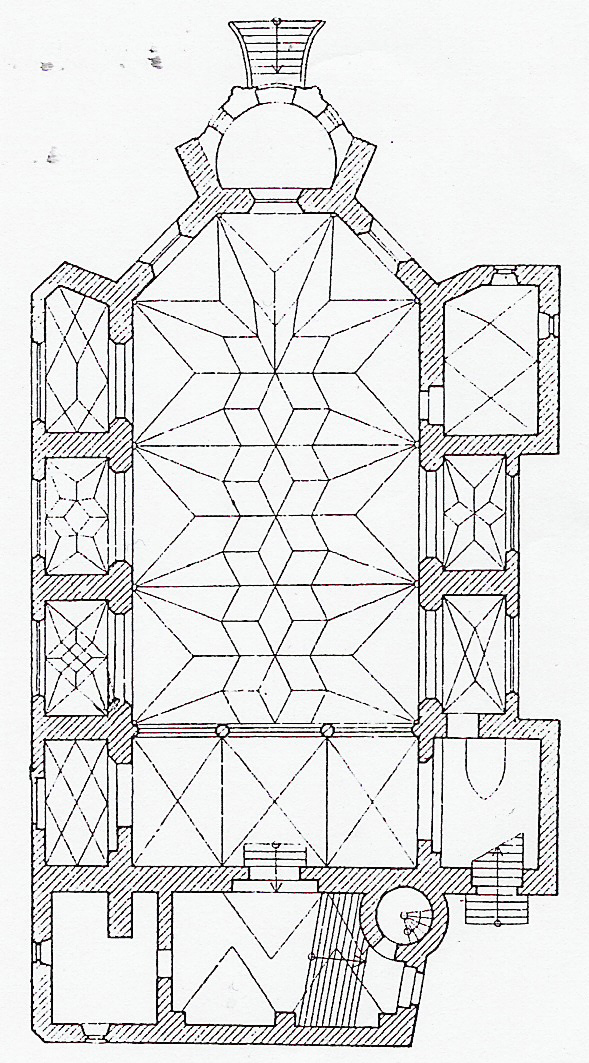
Floor plan of St. Catherine's Church

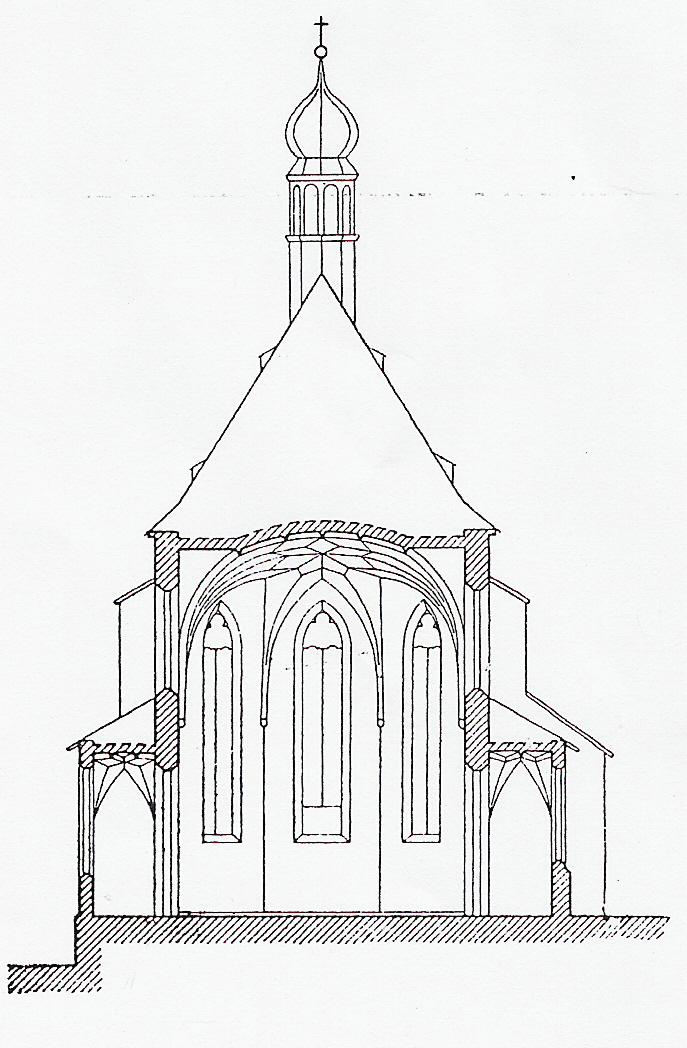
Section of St. Catherine's Church

== Interior ==
The nave is fully covered by the star-shaped vaults. These grid vaults extend to figural cantilevers in the main space. It is very similar to the nave vault of Holy Cross church in Kezmarok. Due to this similarity and the similarity of interior figural decoration it is assumed, that the same masons worked on both of the churches. Side chapels are opened into the nave by pointed arches and are vaulted by mainly star-shaped grid vaults.

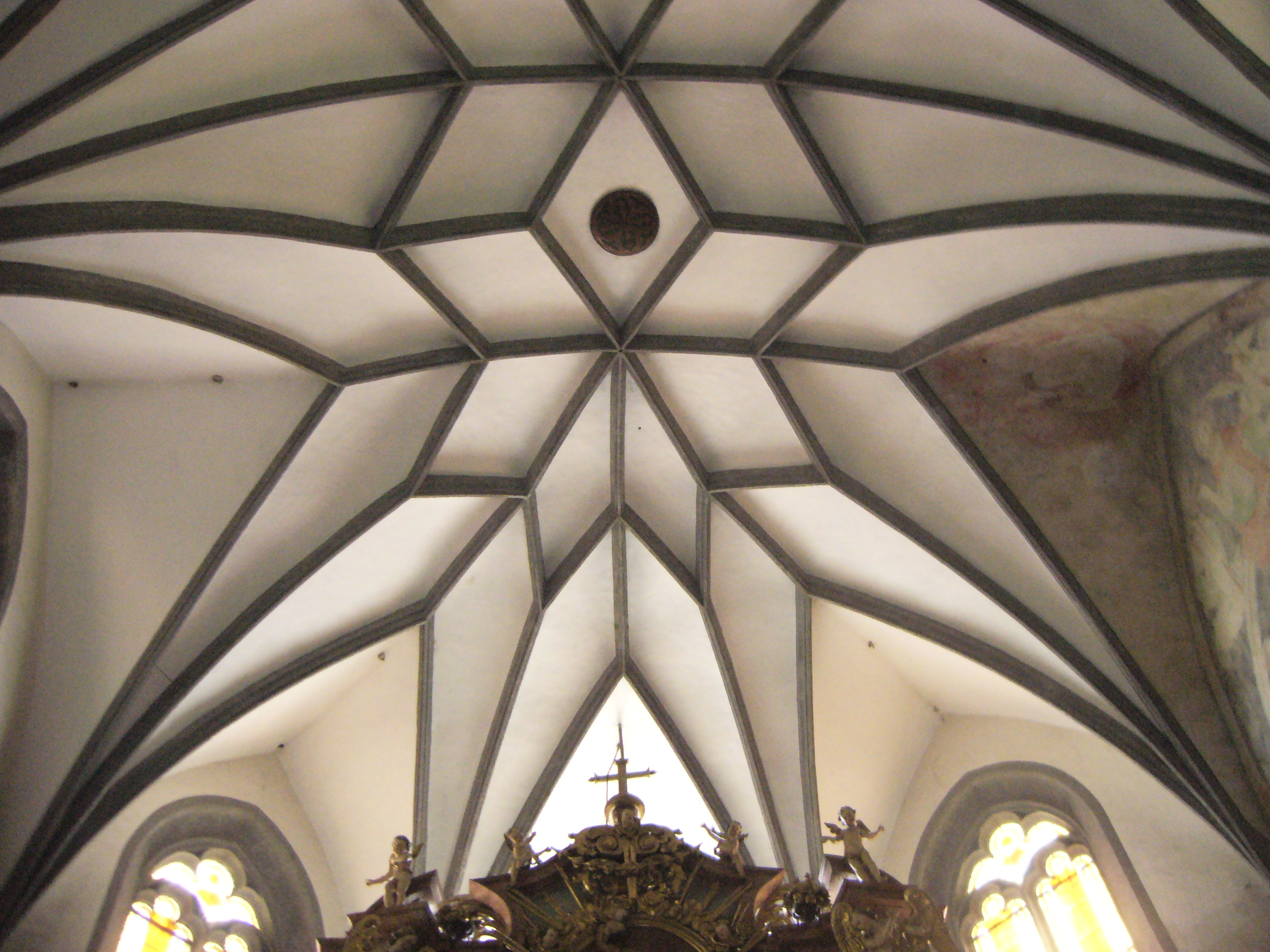
Net vault of St. Catherine's Church

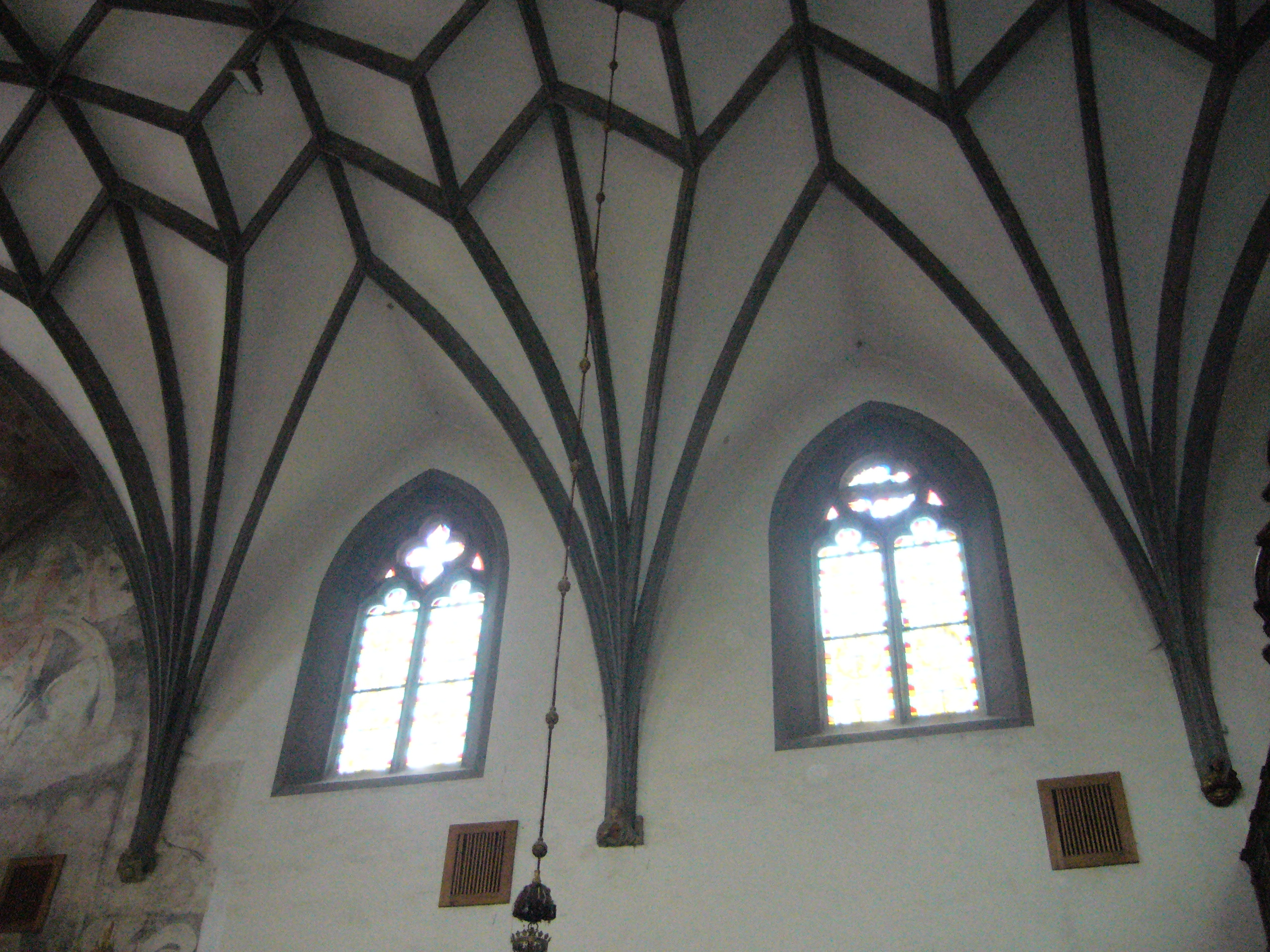
Net vault of St. Catherine's Church

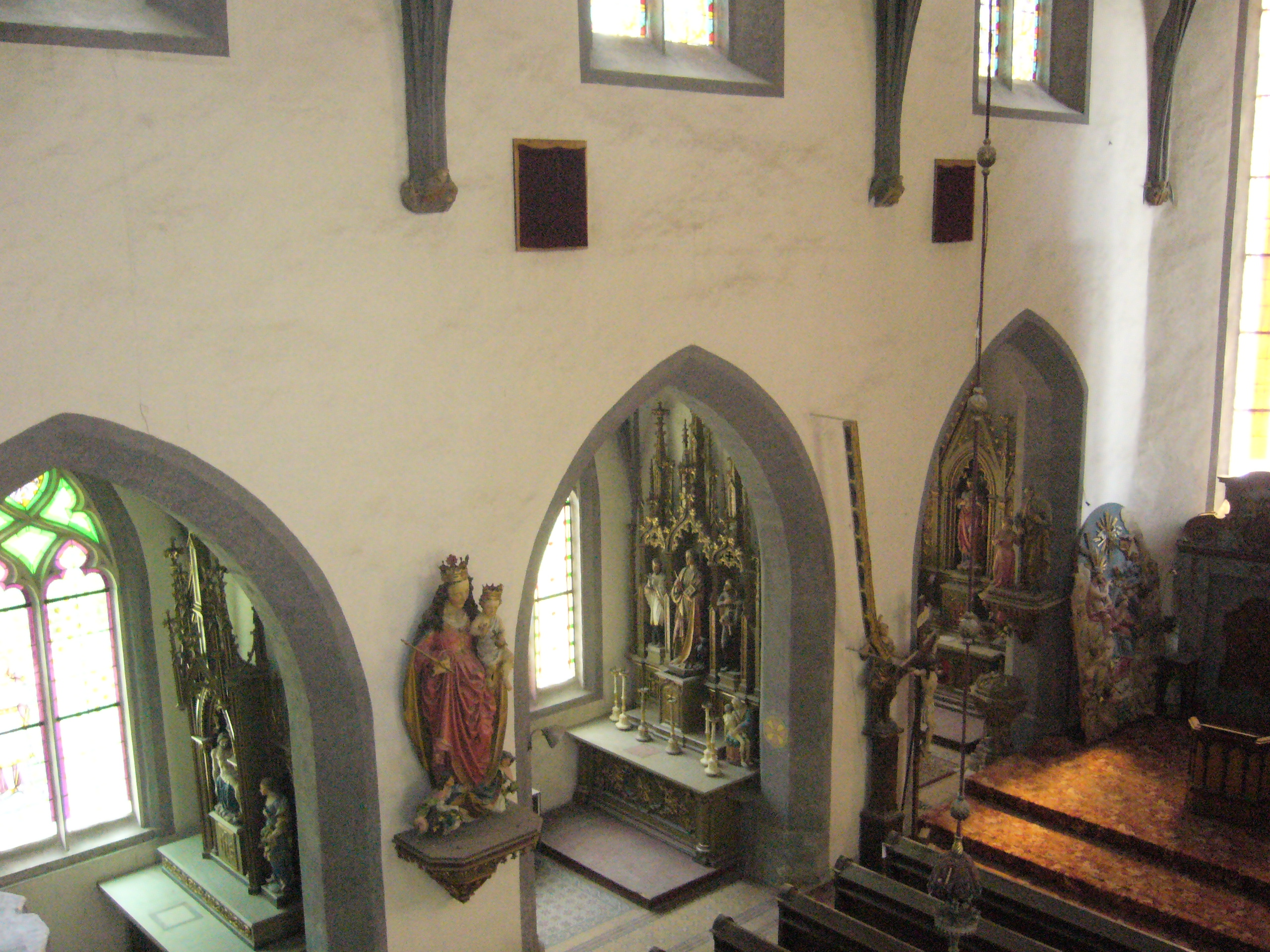
Grid vaults of St. Catherine's Church

Many interior components indicate high level of skilled masons and carpenters. Finely worked out details of portals, figural cantilevers and especially rich decorated baptistery. In the main frontage, there are three high windows filled with stained glass. The lower part is aligned with a half 3-pointed leaf tracery. Windows in the chapels are filled with colourful stained glass traceries. The lower part is separated into 4 sections filled with stained glass with Christian scenes. Merging with the upper part of the window, we can see the 3-pointed half leafed tracery. In the middle there is a 4-pointed leaf tracery with the flame traceries by the sides. Some parts of the windows are dated to year 1894 and the colourful stained glass from the chapels from year 1907.

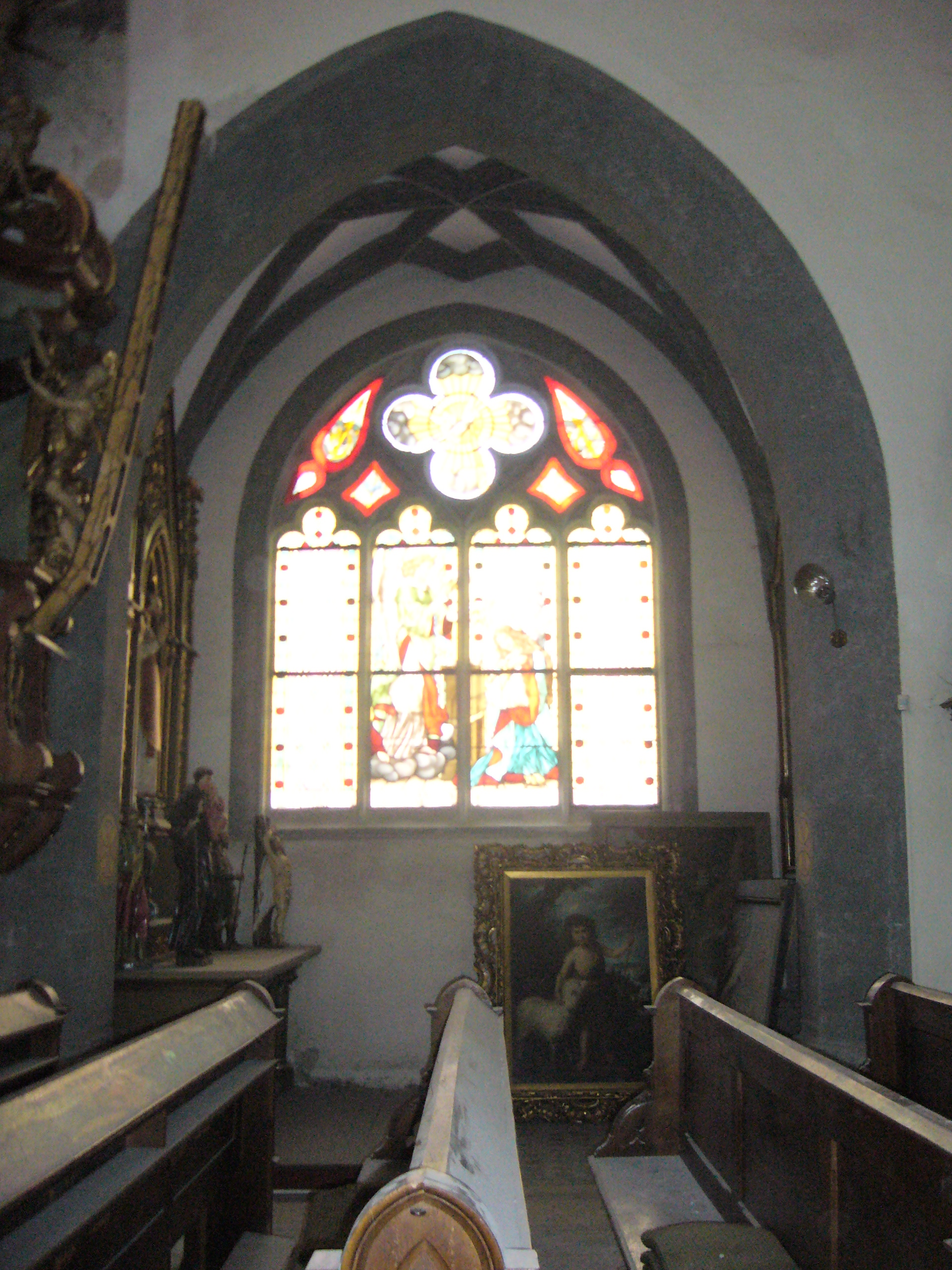
Side chapels of St. Catherine's Church

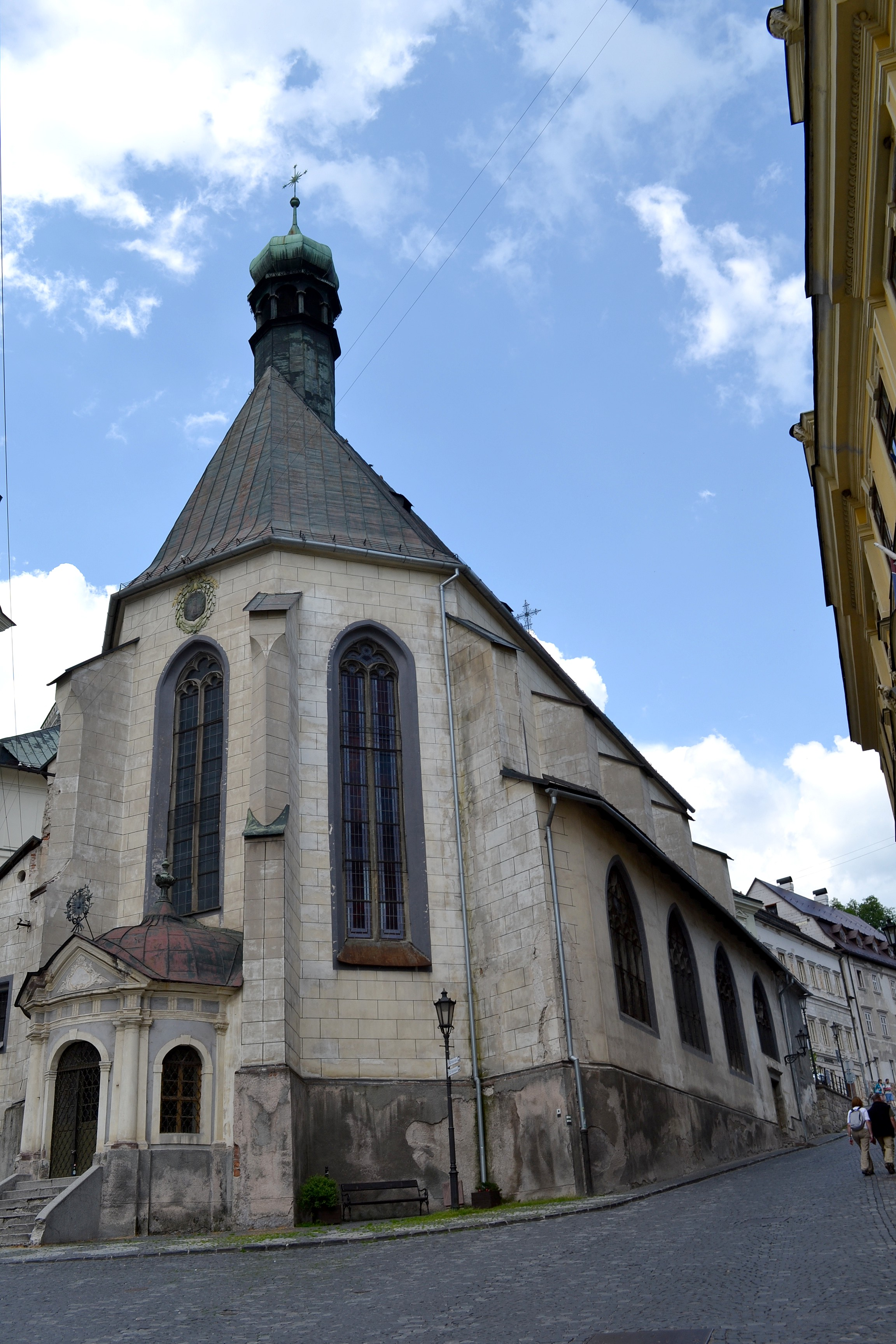
Windows of St. Catherine's Church

== Exterior ==
The present-day facades have been reconstructed according to their original appearance. From exterior, the church has clearly recognizable Late Gothic elements. Bearing system stands out from the nave by the 6 bear retreat pillars on each side. The single chapels have been built between these pillars. Facades are partly made from stone and partly covered with plaster. The roof was covered with copper sheet in year 1656.

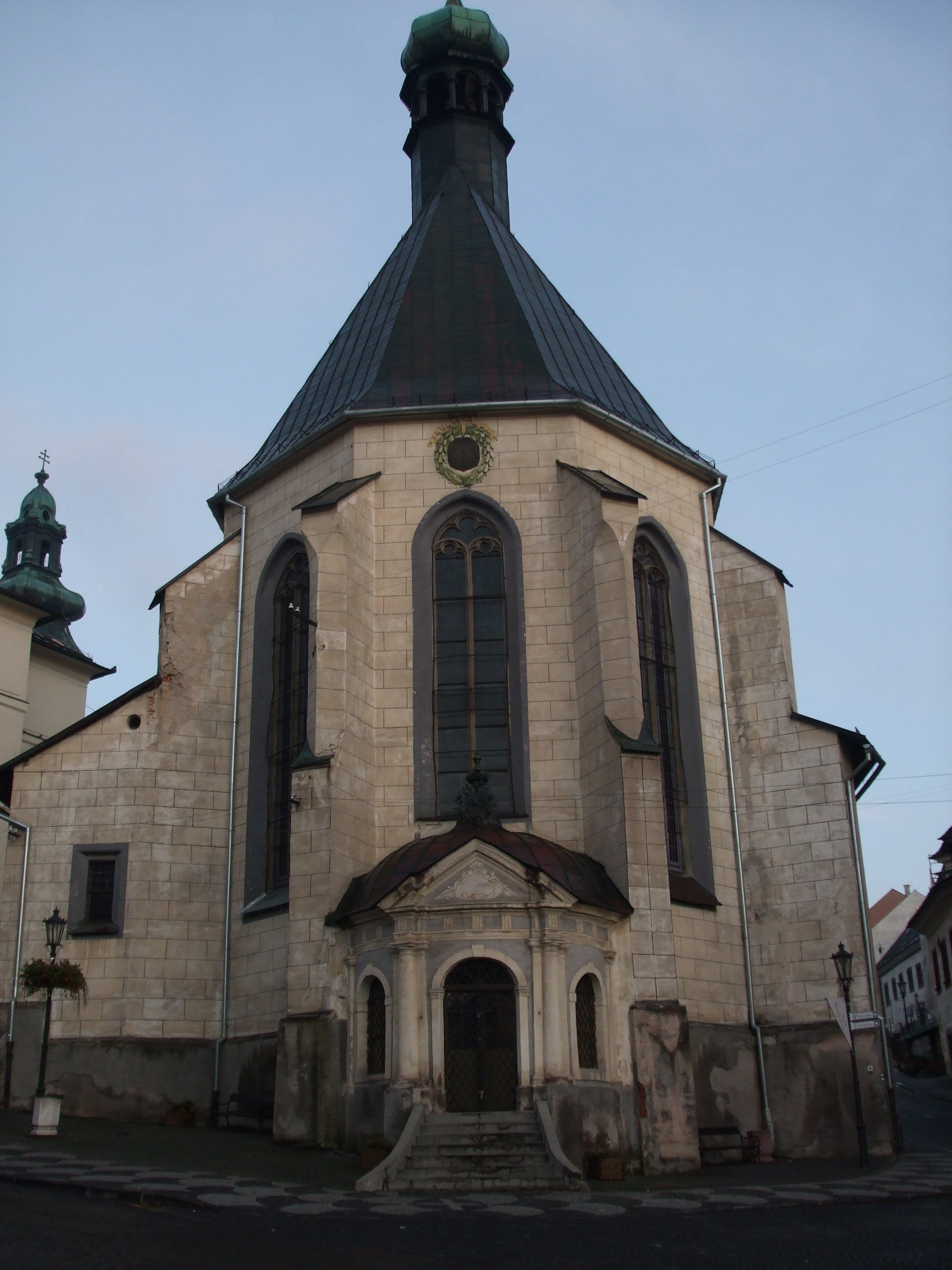
Front facade of St. Catherine's Church

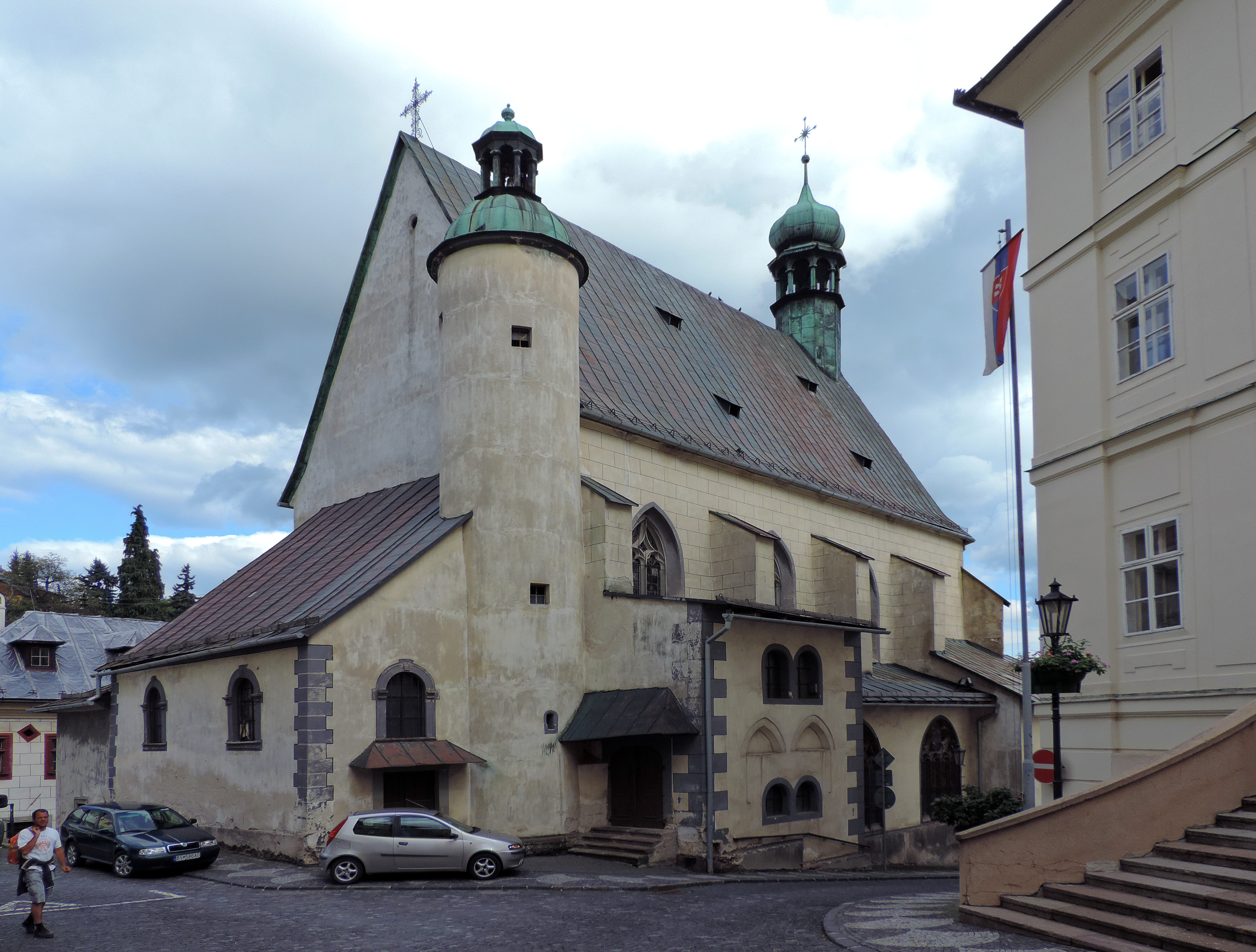
Back side of St. Catherine's Church

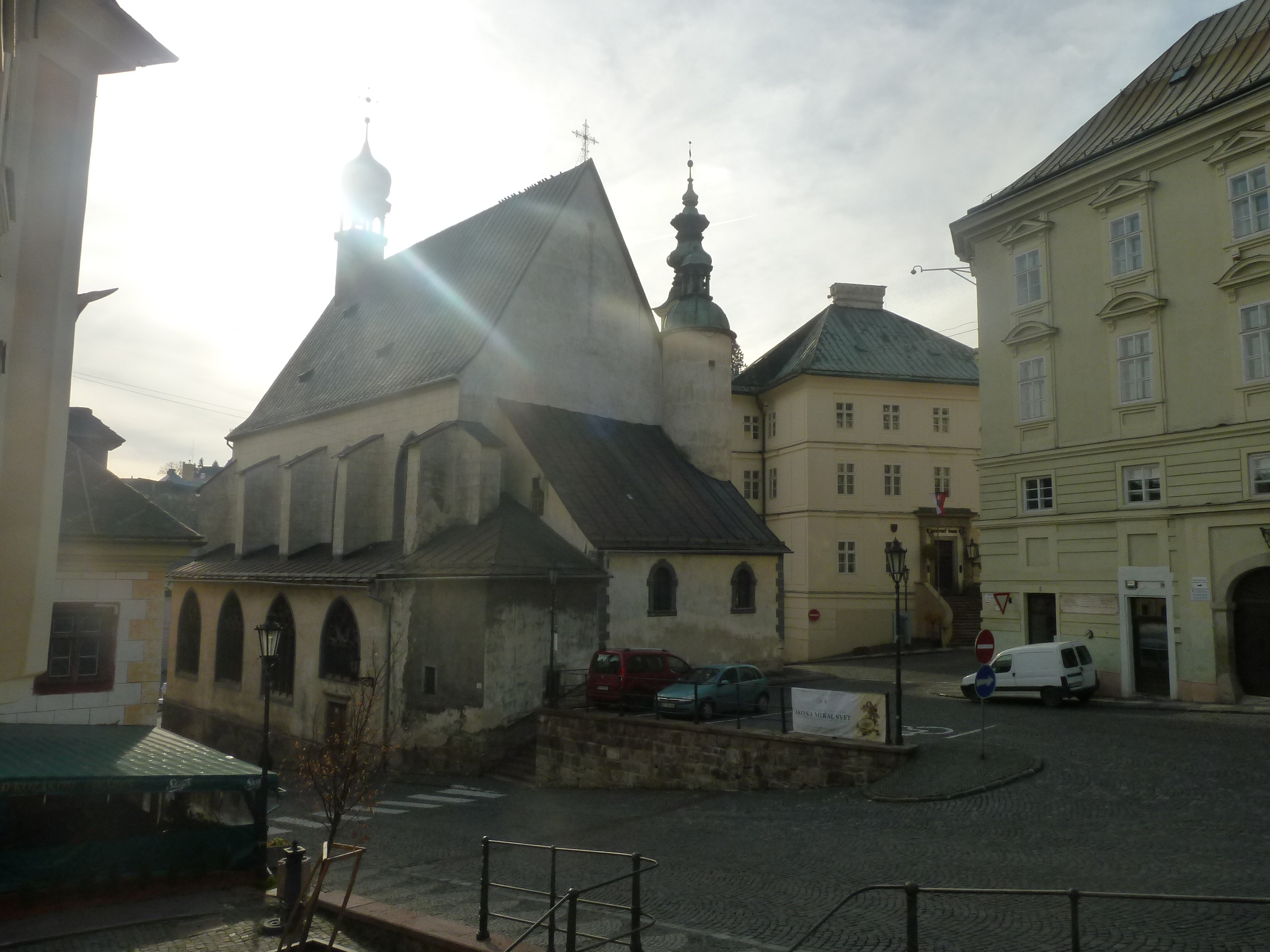
Exterior of St. Catherine's Church

=== Inventory ===
From the original Gothic inventory a valuable rich decorated stone baptistery from the 16th century and a cross from the 15th century were maintained. The statue of Mary, that has been preserved until today, is very valuable wooden statue from year 1506 that comes from the original main altar.

The wall painting depicting the Last Judgement located on the South wall of the presbytery is the most precious part of this church. It is a combination of two different painting techniques: a fresco painting and a painting "a la secco". The scene begins in the vault where the Christ is displayed as the Savior of the world. In the space defined by the vault ribs, the appearance of the Christ repeats, here he is sitting on the rainbow with legs laid on the globe. Next to him there is Virgin Mary and St. John Evangelist painted. Below them, there is a crowd of standing and sitting people next to each other. It anticipates to be 12 apostles but since the painting is in a bad state, it is not possible to define the persons specifically. Under the painting the sorting of the souls is shown with the main character of Archangel Michael who is fighting against the Devil. On the left side, there are saviored people walking towards the Heaven gates, accompanied by an angelic chorus. On the right side, a crowd of people driven by devils, walking most likely into the Leviatan stomach is shown. Devils carry the flags with the pictures of animals representing the seven deadly sins. The painting was discovered during the last reconstruction of the church in years 1971-1973. It is assumed, that originally it also covered the other walls. It is the largest of its type in Slovakia.

The church's original furnishing has changed in the 18th century. The main, the columned altar of St. Catherine from year 1727 (and restored in 1887) has been preserved from the original seven Baroque altars installed at that time. Along with the altar, the painting of St. Catherine's betrothal with Christ has been preserved until today, which is attributed to painter J.G. Grossmayr. The altar paintings were originally changed according to the liturgic periods of the year. By the side of cantilevers we can find statues of St. Barbara and St. Margaret.

== Resources ==
- DULLA, M.; KRCHO, J.; KRIVOŠOVÁ, J.;KVASNICOVÁ, M.; MORAVČÍKOVÁ, H.; POHANIČOVÁ, J.; RAJTÁR, J.; ŠOLTÉSOVÁ, D.; Architektúra na Slovensku stručné dejiny; Slovart, Bratislava, 2005, str. 46-47
- FOLTYN, L.; KEVIZSKY, A.; KUHN, I.; Architektúra na Slovensku od pol. XIX stor.; Slovenské vydavateľstvo krásnej literatúry Bratislava, 1958, str. 51
- Ing. arch. GOJDIČ, I.; prom. hist. PAULUSOVÁ, S.; Banská Štiavnica – kostol sv. Kataríny. Umelecko-historický a architektonický výskum fasád, program pamiatkových úprav 1977, Archív pamiatkového úradu SR Bratislava, Zbierka výskumných správ, sign. T 1396
- JANKOVIČ, V.; Stredoveká sakrálna architektúra v Banskej Štiavnici. In: Pamiatky a múzeá, roč.5, 1995, č.4, s. 24,25
- LUXOVÁ, V.; Figurálne konzoly v Kremnici a Banskej Štiavnici. In: Pamiatky a múzeá, roč.1, 1991, č.1, s.16
- KAHOUN, K.; Neskorogotická sakrálna architektúra na Slovensku, Univerzita Komenského Bratislava, 1995, str.: 22-23,
- KAHOUN, K.; Banskoštiavnický staviteľský okruh v kontaktoch románsko-gotickej strednej Európy. In: Pamiatky a múzeá, roč. 6, 1996, č.1, s. 13
- DVOŘÁKOVÁ, V.; TÓTHOVÁ, Š.; Banská Štiavnica. Svetové kultúrne dedičstvo.; Pamiatkový ústav; Bratislava; 1995
- Súpis pamiatok na Slovensku 1.: A-J; Obzor; Bratislava; 1967
