= Richňava =

- Location within Slovakia
- Location: Banská Bystrica Region, Slovakia
- Coordinates: 48°25′38″N 18°50′49″E
- Type: Artificial lake

Richňava is one of the lakes near Banská Štiavnica in Slovakia. These lakes (or tajchy as locals call them) were created as water reservoirs for the mining industry.
