= Alexander Pituk =

Slovak-Hungarian chess player

Alexander (Sándor) Pituk (October 26, 1904 – April 30, 2002) was a Hungarian chess problem composer and judge.

He was born in and resided all his life in Banská Štiavnica, where he worked as a carpenter. He was appointed an International Judge of Chess Compositions and was awarded the FIDE Master for Chess Composition and the title of Honorary Master of Chess Composition. He is author of 584 compositions (60 of them award-winners). His brother József Viktorián Pituk (1906–1991) was an established painter in Budapest.
