= Počúvadlo =

Počúvadlo Bacsófalva
- Municipality
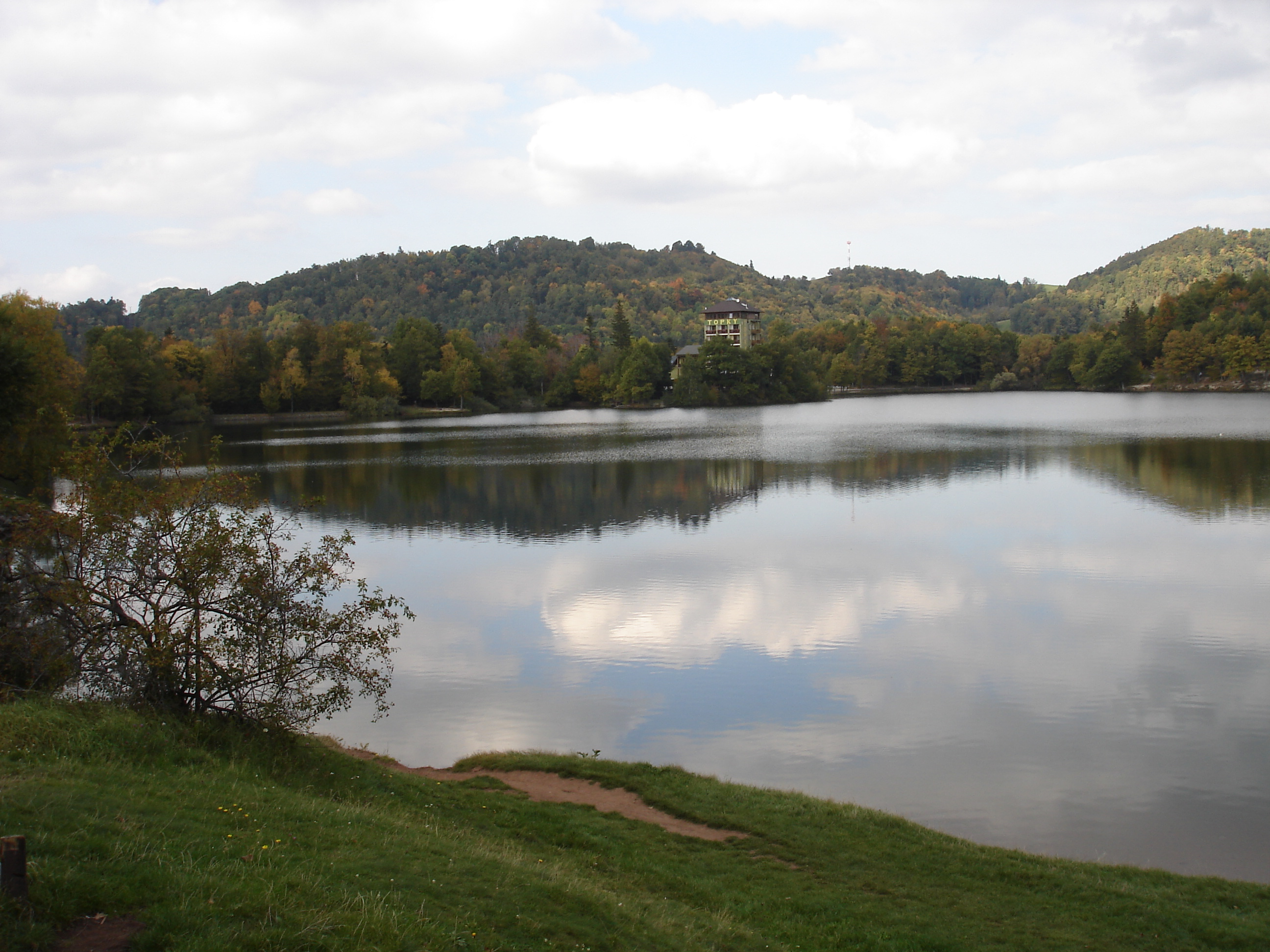
- Počúvadlo Lake is one of medieval mining water reservoirs called tajchy

- Flag

- Location of Počúvadlo in the Banská Bystrica Region Location of Počúvadlo in Slovakia
- Coordinates: 48.37°N 18.83°E
- Country: Slovakia
- Region: Banská Bystrica Region
- District: Banská Štiavnica District
- First mentioned: 1388

Area
  - Total: 15.51 km^{2} (5.99 sq mi)
- Elevation: 540 m (1,770 ft)

Population (2025)
  - Total: 87
- Time zone: UTC+1 (CET)
  - Summer (DST): UTC+2 (CEST)
- Postal code: 969 75
- Area code: +421 45
- Vehicle registration plate (until 2022): BS
- Website: www.pocuvadlo.sk/index.php

Počúvadlo (Hungarian: Bacsófalva) is a village and municipality in Banská Štiavnica District, in the Banská Bystrica Region of Slovakia.

== Geography ==
The municipality lies at an altitude of 540 metres (1,770 ft) and covers an area of 15.51 km^{2} (5.99 sq mi) (2025).

== Etymology ==
The name comes from Slovak počúvať - to listen (the modern meaning), but also to observe, to watch (historic). Počúvadlo - an observation point, a watchtower. Pocholla 1333, Pochyualla 1388, Pochowala 1511, Počuwadlo 1773, Počuwadlo 1808, Počúvadlo 1920.

== Population ==
Population statistic (10 years)
Year	1995	2005	2015	2025
Count	144	115	93	87
Difference		−20.13%	−19.13%	−6.45%

Population statistic
Year	2024	2025
Count	85	87
Difference		+2.35%

It has a population of 87 people (31 December 2025).

=== Ethnicity ===
Census 2021 (1+ %)
Ethnicity	Number	Fraction
Slovak	82	95.34%
Not found out	3	3.48%
Czech	1	1.16%
Hungarian	1	1.16%
Total	86	

In year 2021 was 86 people by ethnicity 82 as Slovak, 3 as Not found out, 1 as Czech and 1 as Hungarian.

Note on population: The difference values of population numbers in the table "Population statistic" and in the sections "Ethnicity" & "Religion" is caused by the use of various statistical methods.

=== Religion ===
Census 2021 (1+ %)
Religion	Number	Fraction
Evangelical Church	34	39.53%
None	22	25.58%
Roman Catholic Church	18	20.93%
Greek Catholic Church	4	4.65%
Not found out	3	3.49%
Bahá'i Community	2	2.33%
Ad hoc movements	2	2.33%
Paganism and natural spirituality	1	1.16%
Total	86	

In year 2021 was 86 people by religion 34 from Evangelical Church, 22 from None, 18 from Roman Catholic Church, 4 from Greek Catholic Church, 3 from Not found out, 2 from Bahá'i Community, 2 from Ad hoc movements and 1 from Paganism and natural spirituality.
