= Nový zámok =

New Castle
- Nový zámok
- Banská Štiavnica in Slovakia
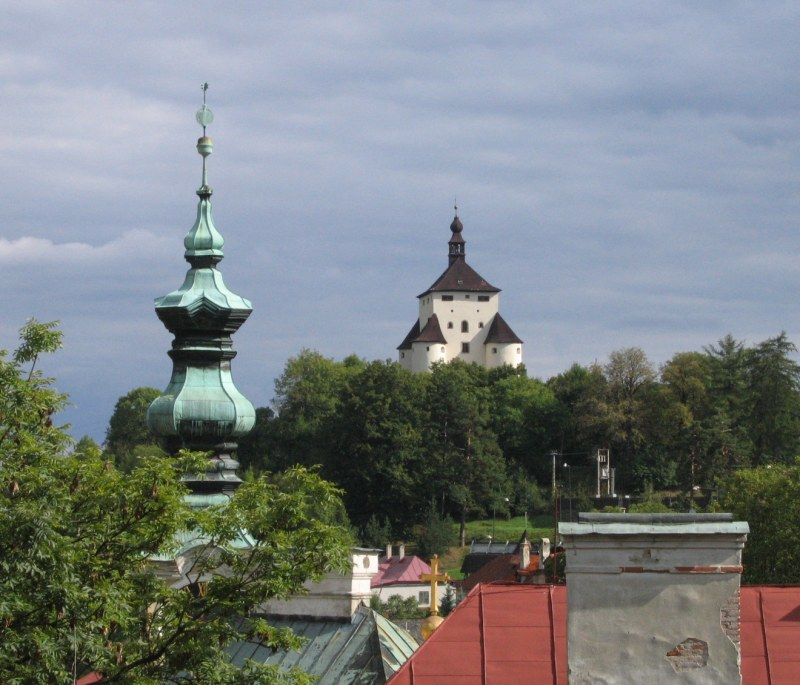
- Nový zámok in Banská Štiavnica

Site information
- Type: Fortress
- Open to the public: yes

Location
- Location in Slovakia
- Coordinates: 48.455°N 18.896°E

Site history
- Built: 1564-1571
- Built by: Town council Banská Štiavnica
- Materials: Stone
- Fate: Intact

Nový zámok (literally "New Castle") is a castle in Banská Štiavnica, Slovakia. The castle is located on a hill south of the city center at an altitude of 630m above sealevel, marking the highest point of the city center.

== History ==
After the defeat of the Hungarian troops by the Ottoman army in the battle of Mohács in 1526, defences in more northern places in Hungary needed to be reinforced with new defensive structures. Shortly after the northern mining region started defence preparations as the region was a great resource of precious metals at that time. In 1541 the town council decided on the fortification of Selmeczbánya. New Castle – a national cultural monument – is a six-floor Renaissance building with four bastions. It was constructed in 1564–1571 as a watch tower during the Ottoman wars. Because of its dominant position, it was also used as the town's live clock (exact time was announced every quarter of an hour on a trumpet).

== Today ==
A permanent exhibition called Anti-Turkish Wars in Slovakia is installed on four floors of the castle. The highest floor offers a panoramic view of Banská Štiavnica and its environs.
