= Banská Štiavnica =

City in Slovakia

- Municipality
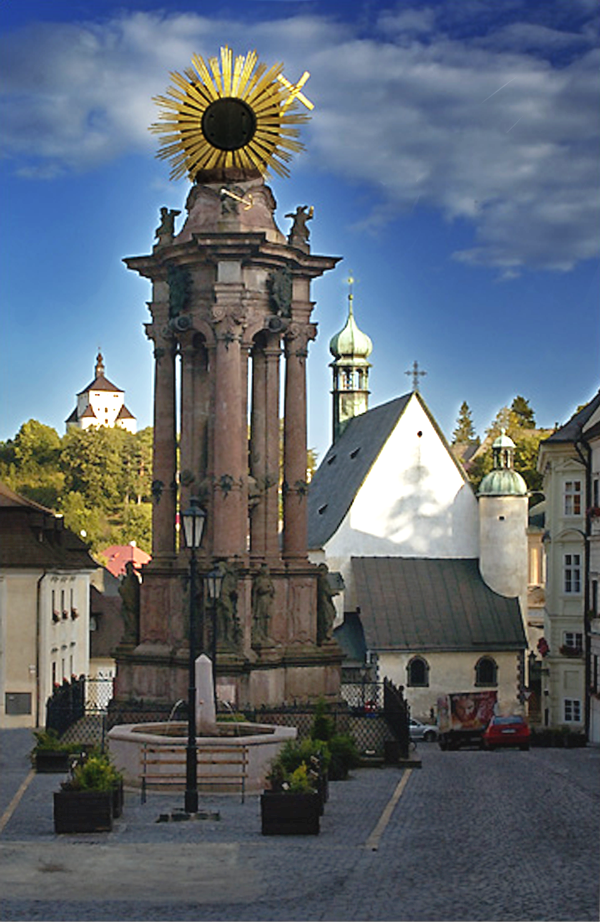
- Trinity Square (Námestie svätej Trojice) in Banská Štiavnica

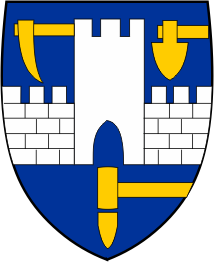
- Flag Coat of arms

- Location of Banská Štiavnica in the Banská Bystrica Region Location of Banská Štiavnica in Slovakia
- Coordinates: 48°27′29″N 18°53′47″E
- Country: Slovakia
- Region: Banská Bystrica Region
- District: Banská Štiavnica District
- First mentioned: 1156

Government
  - Mayor: Nadežda Babiaková

Area
  - Total: 32.88 km^{2} (12.70 sq mi)
- (2022)
- Elevation: 621 m (2,037 ft)

Population (2025)
  - Total: 9,208

Population by ethnicity (2011)
  - Slovak: 86.5%
  - Roma: 0.5%
  - Czech: 0.4%
  - Hungarian: 0.4%
  - Other: 0.2%
  - Unreported: 12%

Population by religion (2011)
  - Roman Catholic: 55%
  - Lutheran: 6.7%
  - Greek Catholic: 0.4%
  - Jehovah's Witness: 0.3%
  - Adventist: 0.3%
  - Other: 2.3%
  - Non-religious: 19.4%
  - Unreported: 15.6%
- Time zone: UTC+1 (CET)
  - Summer (DST): UTC+2 (CEST)
- Postal code: 969 01
- Area code: +421 45
- Vehicle registration plate (until 2022): BS
- Website: www.banskastiavnica.sk

UNESCO World Heritage Site
- Official name: Historic Town of Banská Štiavnica and the Technical Monuments in its Vicinity
- Criteria: iv, v
- Reference: 618
- Inscription: 1993 (17th Session)

Banská Štiavnica (Slovak pronunciation: [ˈbanskaː ˈʂcɪɐʋɲitsa]; German: Schemnitz; Hungarian: Selmecbánya (Selmec), pronounced [ˈʃɛlmɛd͡zbaːɲɒ]) is a town in central Slovakia, in the middle of an immense caldera created by the collapse of an ancient volcano. For its size, the caldera is known as the Štiavnica Mountains. Banská Štiavnica has a population of less than 10,000. The town was an important medieval mining centre. The surviving urban centre was formed during the 16th century. Because of their historical value, the town and its surroundings were proclaimed by the UNESCO to be a World Heritage Site on December 11, 1993.

== History ==
The fate of Banská Štiavnica has been closely linked to the exploitation of its abundant resources of silver ore. According to evidence from excavations, the site was settled during the Neolithic period.

The first mining settlement was founded by Celts in the 3rd century BC. It was probably occupied by the Celtic Cotini tribe. Roman authors mentioned mining activities of the Cotini, who had lived in present-day central Slovakia until they were deported to Pannonia within the Marcomannic Wars by Rome. The site was also settled by early Hungarians, and an old Hungarian fortified settlement was situated here in the 10th and 11th centuries. The site was called “terra banensium” (the land of miners) as early as 1156. The local Slavic population gave the name „Štiavnica“ (acidic stream) to the settlement in the valley, and the settlement on the hill above (Ligotavá hora, or Glanzenberg – the shiny mountain) came to be called „Bánya“ (the mine). The single common name „Schebnyzbana“ was documented for the first time in 1255. The local Slavic population was joined by skilled German settlers who started arriving in the 13th century. They adapted the local name to the German "Schemnitz". Banská Štiavnica gained the status of a royal town in 1238, as one of the first towns in the Kingdom of Hungary.

In the High and Late Middle Ages, the town was the main producer of silver and gold in the Kingdom of Hungary. During the Ottoman Wars, the Turks made concerted efforts to conquer rich mining towns in Upper Hungary (Banská Štiavnica, Banská Bystrica, and Kremnica). This new threat led Banská Štiavnica to build powerful fortifications, including two castles, in the 16th century. As one of the most important centers of the Protestant Reformation in the country, the town belonged to the Protestant "League of Seven Mining Towns" together with Banská Belá, Banská Bystrica, Kremnica, Ľubietová, Nová Baňa, and Pukanec.

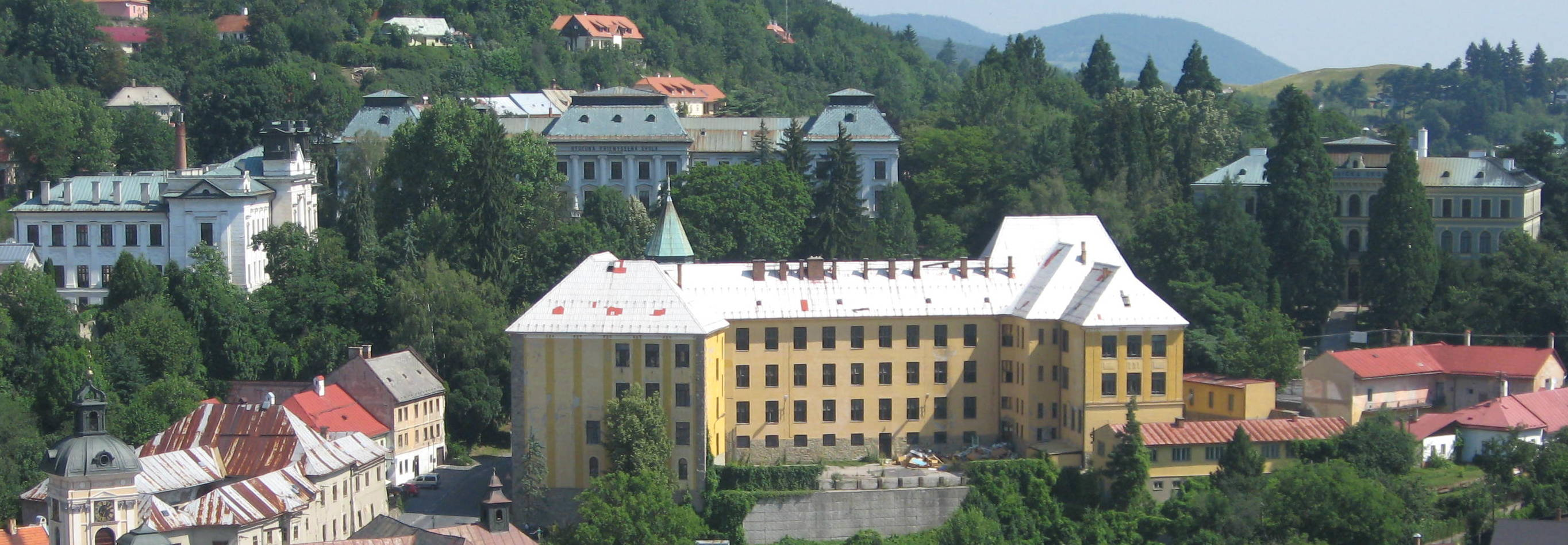
School buildings in Banská Štiavnica, end of 19th – early 20th century

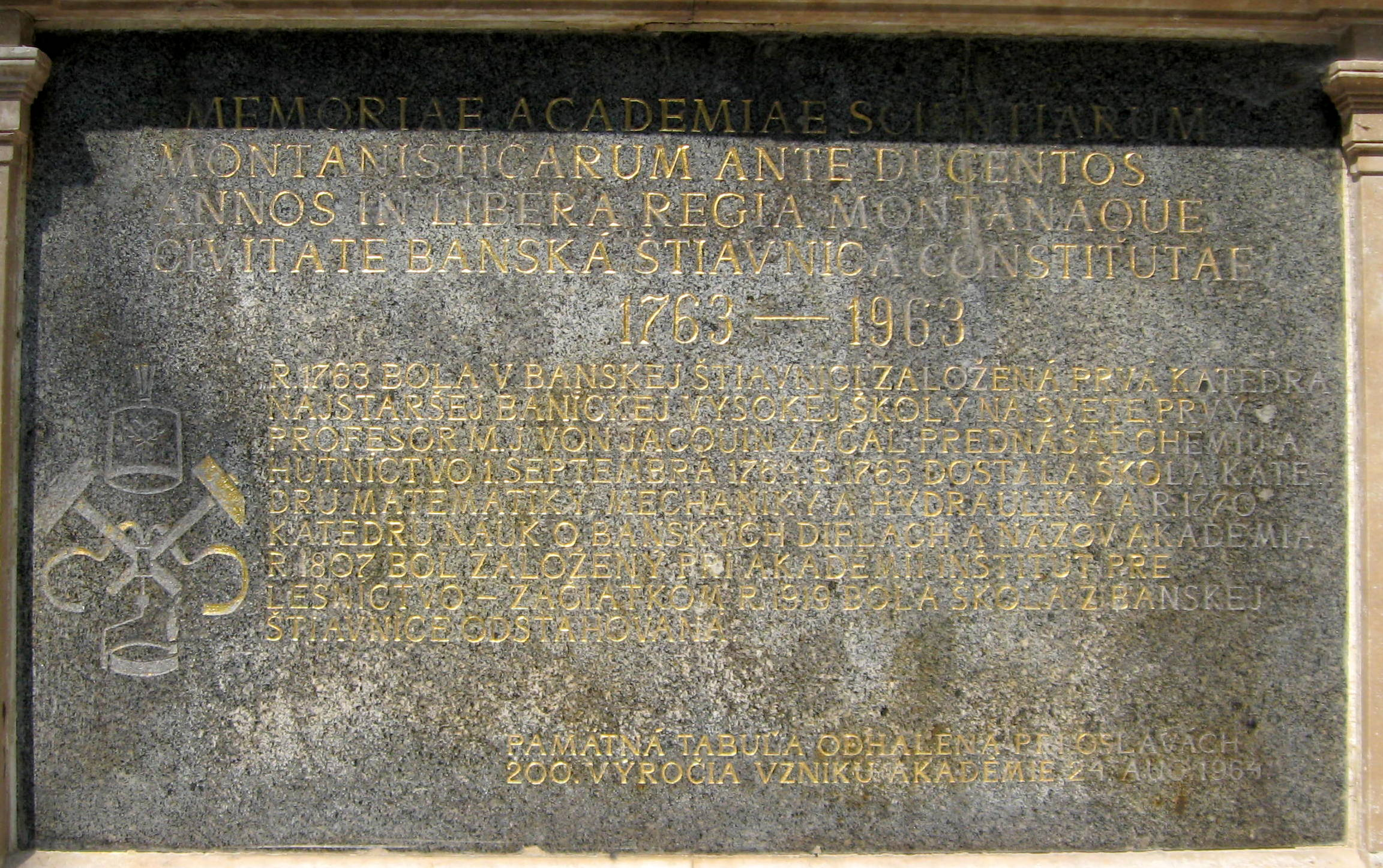
Academy of Mining and Forestry memorial plaque

The town was also a leading center of innovation in the mining industry. In 1627, gunpowder was used there in a mine for one of the first times in the world (After Le Thillot, France). To drain water from the flooded mines, a sophisticated system of water reservoirs and channels, known as tajchy, was designed and built by the local scientists Jozef Karol Hell, Maximilian Hell, and Samuel Mikovíny in the 18th century. Tajchy not only saved the mines from being closed but also provided energy for the early phase of industrialization.

Its Mining Academy, founded there in 1735 by Samuel Mikovíny, was the first mining school in the Kingdom of Hungary. Beginning in 1763, the Hofkammer in Vienna, with support from Queen Maria Theresa, transformed the school into the Academy of Mining. In 1807, a Forestry Institute was "established under the decision of Emperor Franz I"; in 1848, the school was renamed the Academy of Mining and Forestry, 'the first technical university in the world'. In 1919, after the creation of Czechoslovakia, the Academy was moved to Sopron in Hungary. The student traditions of the Academy (School traditions of Selmec) are still living in its successors, the University of Miskolc and Slovak University of Technology in Bratislava, and colleges in Sopron, Székesfehérvár, and Dunaújváros.

In 1782, Banská Štiavnica was the third biggest town in the Kingdom of Hungary (with 23,192 or incl. suburbs 40,000 inhabitants), after Pozsony (today Bratislava) and Debrecen. But the town's development was too closely linked to the mining activity, which had been progressively declining since the second half of the 19th century. Nowadays, Banská Štiavnica is an important center of recreation and tourism, benefiting from its rich historical heritage.

During World War II, Banská Štiavnica was taken by Soviet troops of the 53rd Army on 7 March 1945.

== Landmarks ==
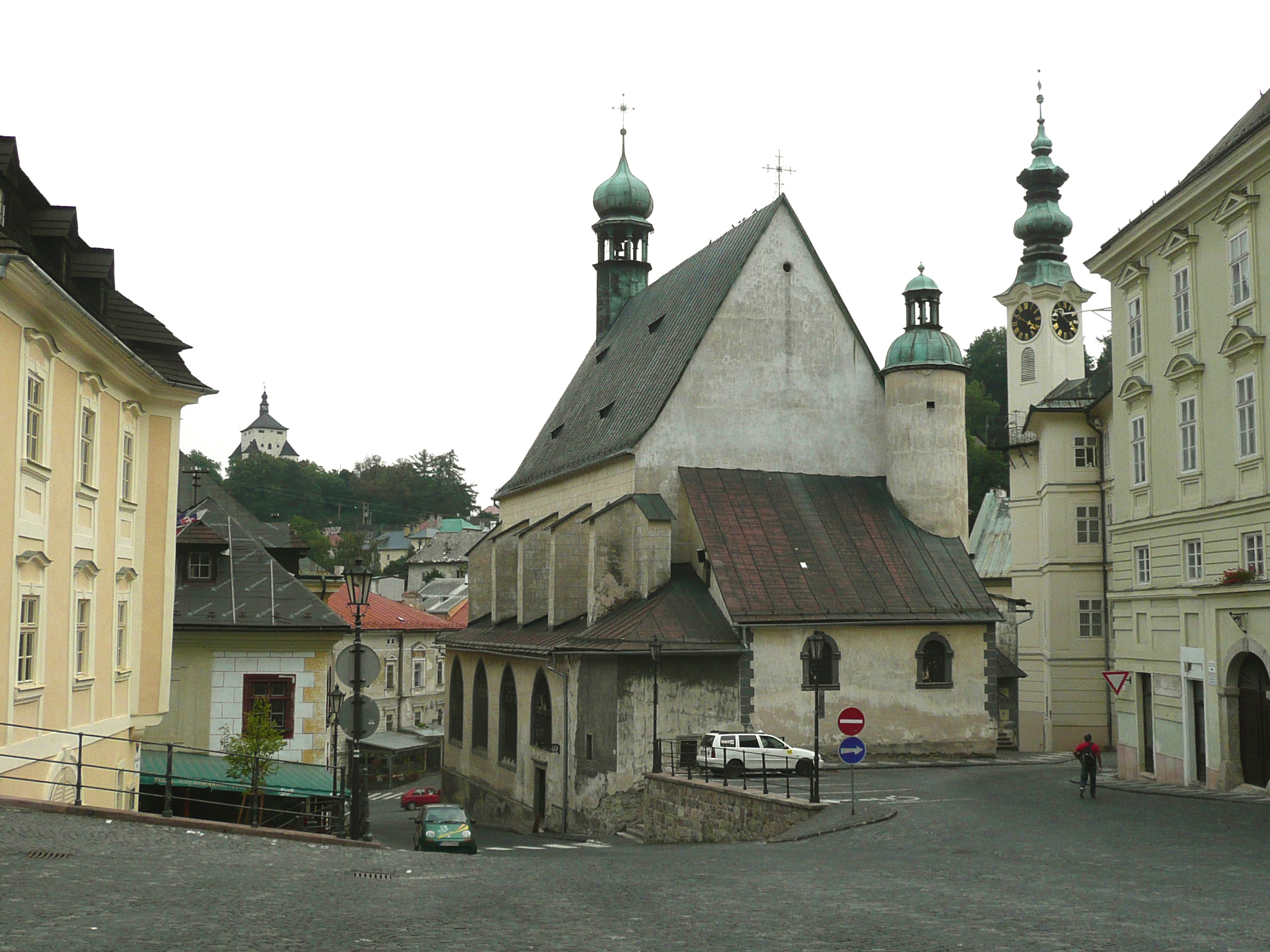
The town viewed from the Trinity square with the "New Castle" left, St. Catherine's church from 1491 in the middle

Town hall

The heart of the town is the historical Trinity Square (Slovak: Trojičné námestie) dominated by a monumental plague column. The square is used for frequent cultural events, and there is also a mineralogical museum. Two castles, the so-called “old” one (Slovak: Starý zámok) and “new” one (Slovak: Nový zámok), have been transformed into museums.

The open-air mining museum offers a 1.5-kilometre (0.93 mi) long underground excursion in mines dating from the 17th century. Visitors will receive helmets, cloaks, and lamps to use during the tour. It is also possible to have an English, German, or Hungarian speaking guide if this is requested in advance. Another ancient mine open to the public (Slovak: Glanzenberg) is even older. This mine, situated just under the center of the town, has attracted numerous famous visitors, from Emperor Joseph II to Prince Albert of Monaco.

The town is surrounded by ancient artificial mining water reservoirs called tajchy. Sixty reservoirs were built in the 15th through 18th centuries to provide energy for the booming mining industry. They are connected by a more than 100-kilometre (62 mi) long network of channels. These extraordinary historical monuments are now used mainly for recreation.

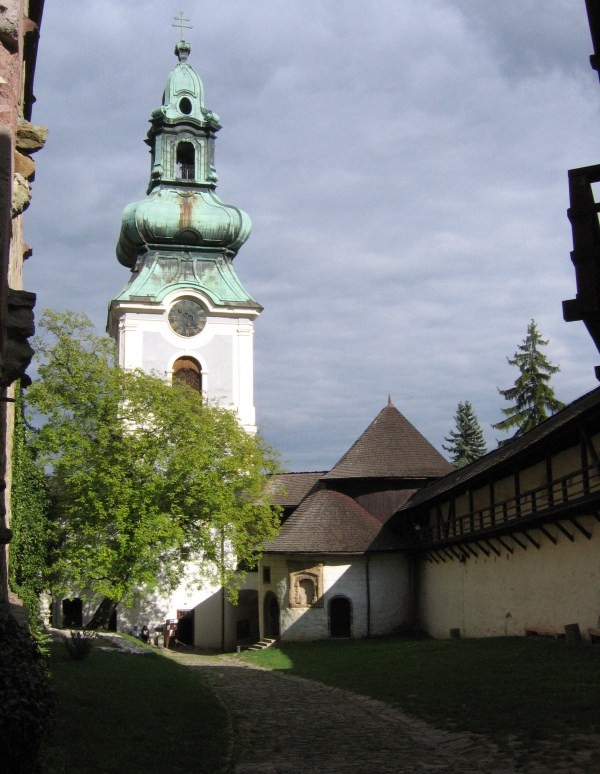
Starý zámok

== Churches ==
- St. Catherine's Church

In Kalvária Banská Štiavnica there is a complex of churches and chapels near Ostry vrch which was built in the eighteenth century by the Jesuits.

== Population ==
Historical population
Year	Pop.	±%
1970	9,118	—
1980	9,342	+2.5%
1991	10,756	+15.1%
2001	10,874	+1.1%
2011	10,409	−4.3%
2021	9,628	−7.5%
Source: Censuses

Population statistic (10 years)
Year	1995	2005	2015	2025
Count	10,596	10,674	10,210	9208
Difference		+0.73%	−4.34%	−9.81%

Population statistic
Year	2024	2025
Count	9293	9208
Difference		−0.91%

It has a population of 9208 people (31 December 2025).

=== Ethnicity ===
Census 2021 (1+ %)
Ethnicity	Number	Fraction
Slovak	9266	96.24%
Not found out	267	2.77%
Total	9628	

In year 2021 was 9628 people by ethnicity 9266 as Slovak, 267 as Not found out, 91 as Romani, 69 as Czech, 47 as Hungarian, 38 as Other, 24 as German, 12 as Russian, 11 as Rusyn, 10 as Italian, 9 as Romanian, 8 as Polish, 7 as Irish, 7 as Austrian, 5 as Jewish, 5 as Ukrainian, 3 as Serbian, 3 as Iranian, 1 as Moravian, 1 as Greek, 1 as Croatian, 1 as Bulgarian, 1 as English and 1 as Albanian.

Note on population: The difference values of population numbers in the table "Population statistic" and in the sections "Ethnicity" & "Religion" is caused by the use of various statistical methods.

=== Religion ===
Census 2021 (1+ %)
Religion	Number	Fraction
Roman Catholic Church	4784	49.69%
None	3461	35.95%
Evangelical Church	627	6.51%
Not found out	403	4.19%
Total	9628	

In year 2021 was 9628 people by religion 4784 from Roman Catholic Church, 3461 from None, 627 from Evangelical Church, 403 from Not found out, 62 from Greek Catholic Church, 46 from Other and not ascertained christian church, 42 from Christian Congregations in Slovakia, 33 from Other, 30 from Ad hoc movements, 25 from Baptists Church, 24 from Jehovah's Witnesses, 24 from Buddhism, 14 from Seventh-day Adventist Church, 10 from Calvinist Church, 8 from Islam, 6 from Paganism and natural spirituality, 6 from Apostolic Church, 5 from Eastern Orthodox Church, 4 from Jewish community, 4 from Hinduism, 3 from Old Catholic Church, 3 from Church of the Brethren, 2 from New Apostolic Church, 1 from United Methodist Church and 1 from Bahá'i Community.

== Twin towns – sister cities ==
Banská Štiavnica is twinned with:

- Hünenberg, Switzerland
- Moravská Třebová, Czech Republic
- Olsztynek, Poland
- Ptuj, Slovenia
- Sopron, Hungary
- Tatabánya, Hungary

== Notable people ==
- Jozef Karol Hell, Hungarian inventor and mining engineer
- Maximilian Hell, Hungarian astronomer
- Dezső Hoffmann, photographer
- Anton Hykisch, writer, diplomat, and politician
- Nikolaus Joseph von Jacquin, Austrian scientist
- Irena Káňová, politician
- Andrej Kmeť, scientist
- Domokos Kosáry, Hungarian historian
- Ľudovít Lačný, chess problem composer
- Master MS, Hungarian painter
- Samuel Mikovíny, mathematician, engineer, and cartographer
- Alexander Pituk, Hungarian chess problem composer
- Andrej Sládkovič, Lutheran pastor, poet, critic, publicist, and translator

== Genealogical resources ==
The records for genealogical research are available at the state archive in Banská Bystrica (Slovak: Štátny archív v Banskej Bystrici).

- Roman Catholic church records (births/marriages/deaths): 1627–1892 (parish A)
- Lutheran church records (births/marriages/deaths): 1594–1925 (parish A)

== Gallery ==
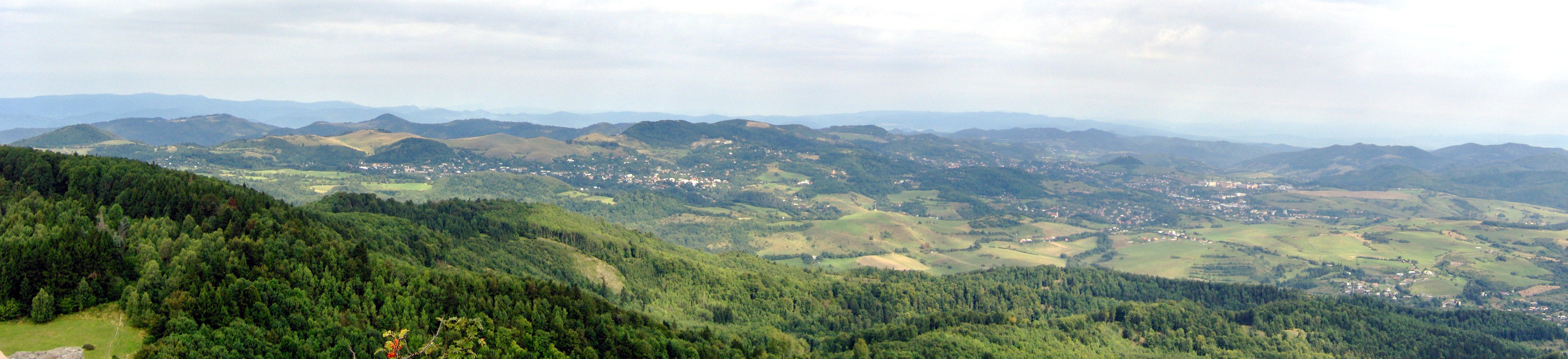
Sight from Mount Sitno towards Banská Štiavnica, inside a huge caldera

== See also ==
- List of municipalities and towns in Slovakia
- School traditions of Selmec
- Senica, Slovakia (German: Senitz)
