= Sámuel Mikoviny =

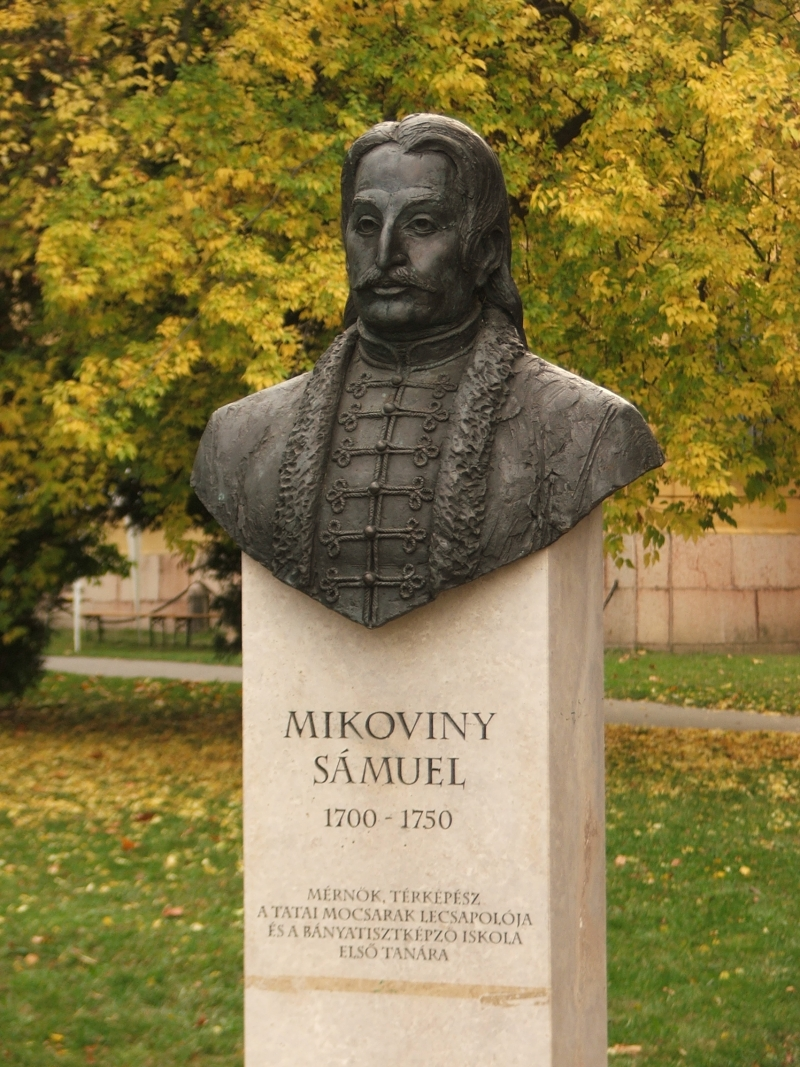
- Sámuel Mikoviny sculpture in Tata
- Born: 1686-1700? Turicska?, Kingdom of Hungary (Turíčky, today part of Cinobaňa, Slovakia)
- Died: 23 March 1750
- Occupations: Mathematician, engineer, cartographer

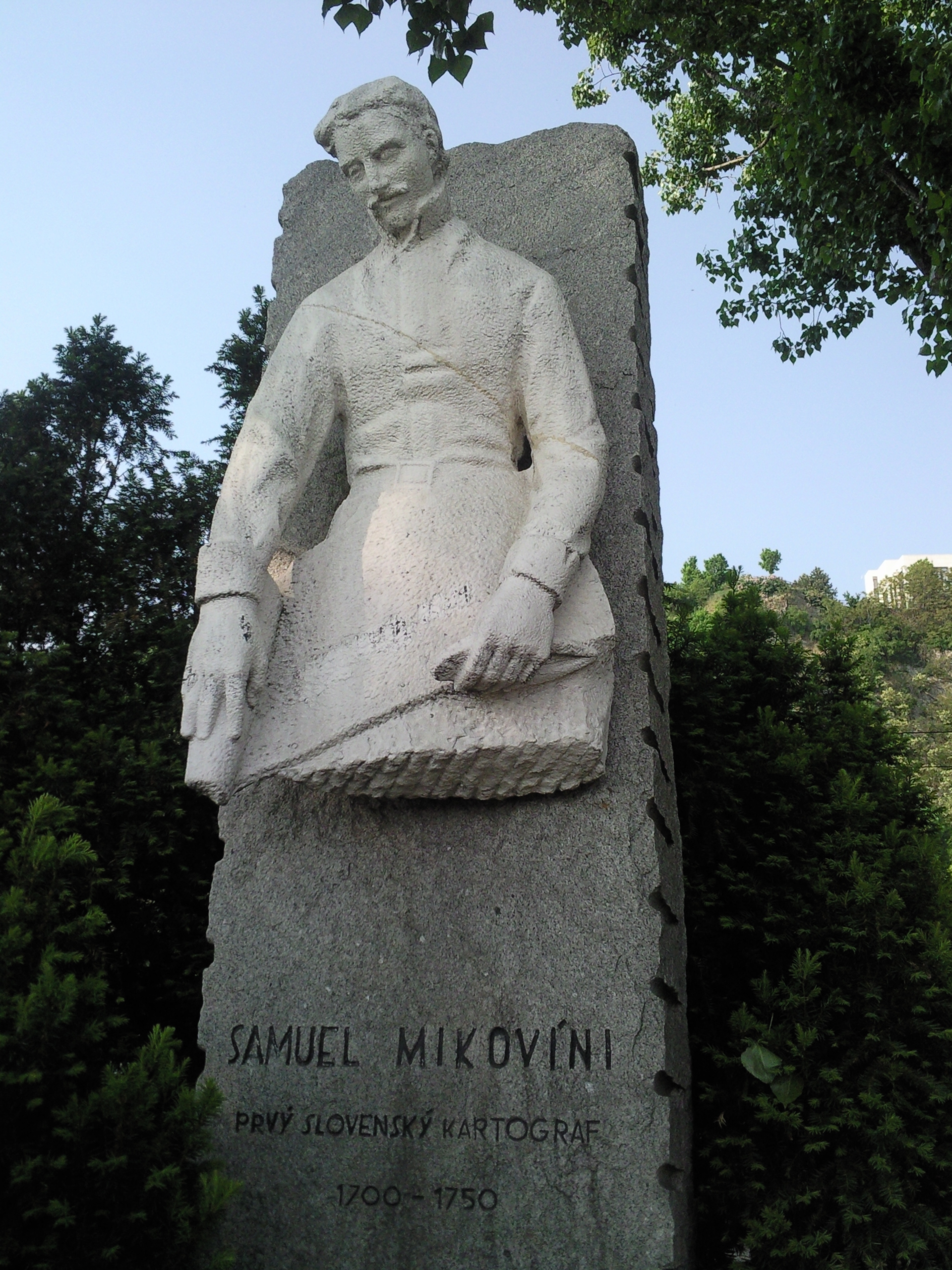
Sámuel Mikoviny sculpture in Bratislava

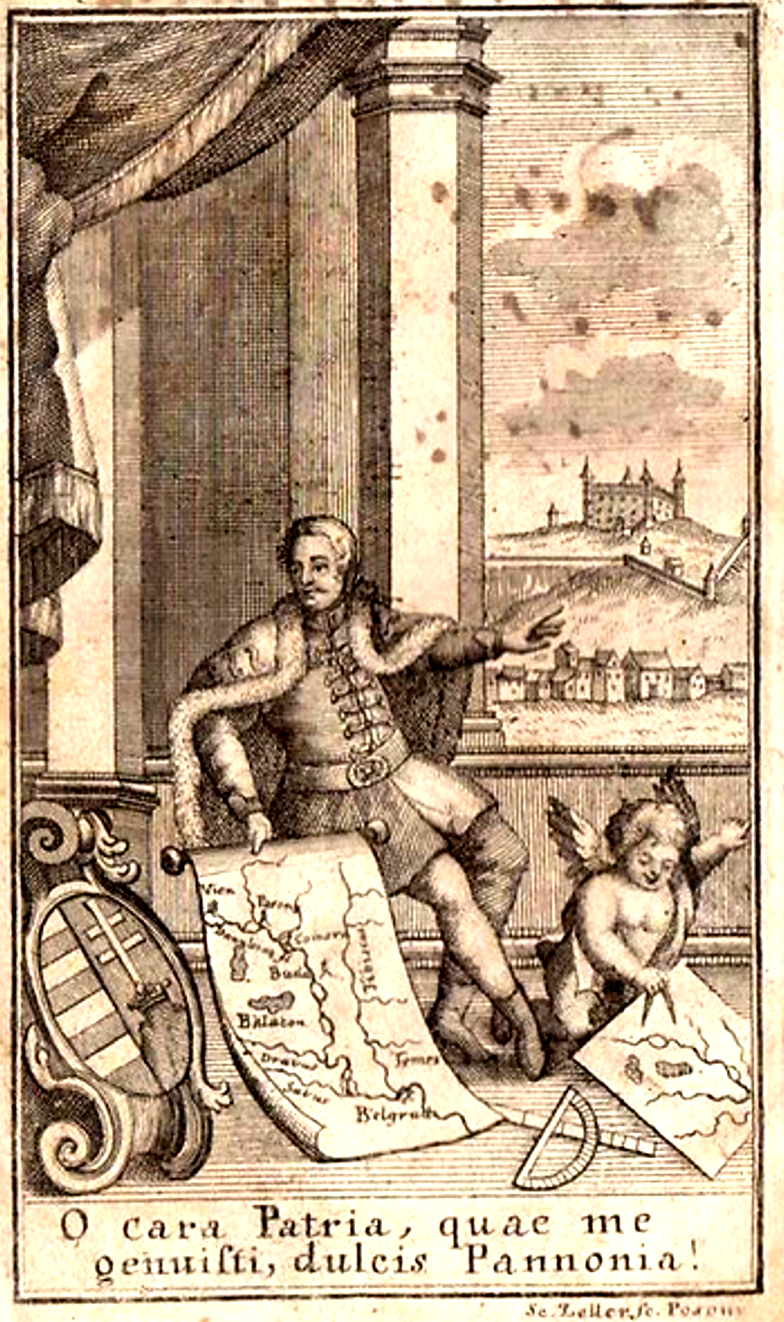
Portrait of Sámuel Mikoviny by Sebestyén Zeller with the map of Hungary in his hand and the Castle of Pressburg in the background. Inscription: "O Cara Patria quae me genuisti, dulcis Panonia" - "Oh, my dear homeland, who gave me birth, sweet Pannonia"

Sámuel Mikoviny (Hungarian: Mikoviny Sámuel, Slovak: Samuel Mikovíni ? – 23 March 1750) was a mathematician, engineer, cartographer, and professor. He was a leading representative of science and technology in the 18th century Kingdom of Hungary and Habsburg monarchy.

== Family ==
The family lived scattered throughout the territory of present-day Slovakia, some members have moved also other areas of the contemporary Kingdom of Hungary. His father, a poor lower nobleman Samuel Micovini, originated from the most numerous branch from Breznóbánya (today Brezno, Slovakia). He worked in several ethnic Slovak villages, firstly as a teacher in Uhorszka (today Uhorské, Slovakia), and Hradistya (today Hradište, Slovakia), later he became an Evangelic priest in Turicska (today Turíčky, Slovakia). In 1663, he moved to Ábelfalva (today Ábelová, Slovakia). His mother was Helena Ničková (Nicsko, Niczko).

The date and the place of birth of his son polymath Sámuel is unknown. (Note: The archives in Turíčky (Turicska) and Ábelová (Ábelfalva) were partially damaged during several disasters.) Mikoviny was possibly born in Turicska or Ábelfalva, in 1686 or 1700. In 1727, he married Anna Regina Gillig from Szentgyörgy (today Svätý Jur, Slovakia). The couple had five children, but only three survived - sons Károly Szaniszló (in Slovak: Karol Stanislav), a geodest; Tamás Lajos (Tomáš Ľudovít), an engineer; and a daughter Erzsébet Krisztina (Alžbeta Kristína).

In the literature, Mikoviny is mentioned as a Slovak polymath (the first Slovak engineer) and also as a Hungarian. The contemporary elites identified themselves as members of common Natio Hungarica regardless of their ethnic origin, whereas the contemporary term Hungarus is an umbrella term covering ethnic Hungarians (Magyars), Slovaks and other ethnic groups in the Kingdom of Hungary because the self-definition through a common homeland, class or religion was more common than through language. The Slovak origin of Mikoviny was noticed already by Ján Kollár and is supported by further research in present-day Slovakia. Besides another, the research in local archives confirmed that the father of Sámuel Mikoviny wrote his records in Turicska in Slovak. Mikoviny declared himself in more of his maps and works as "nobilis Hungarus". Two letters written in Hungarian remained after him, however - as per the contemporary customs - by his studies and works mostly he used the German and the Latin language.

His name is written in contemporary sources and later literature in many forms - Mikoviny, Mikowiny, Mikovini, Mikovényi, Mickovini, Mikovinyi, Mikovínij, Mikowini, Mikovény. He used mostly the form Mikoviny and wrote his name without any diacritics.

== Studies and work ==
He learnt engraving at Nuremberg, and studied mathematics at the nearby University of Altdorf and later in Jena. He probably took private lessons in astronomy and surveying in Vienna before he returned to Pressburg (Pozsony, present-day Bratislava).

In Nuremberg, Mikoviny showed that he was a good engraver and a gifted artist. His series of engravings, views of Altdorf and Nuremberg was published in a booklet of Altdorf in 1723. The publication also included a map of the district. His work was significantly influenced by another renowned scholar of the 18th century living in the multi-ethnic Kingdom of Hungary, Matthias Bel. Earlier Mikoviny engraved a map of Demänová Ice Cave and several illustrations for Bel's book Hungariae antiquae et novae prodromus (Messenger of Old and New Hungary), published in 1723 in Nuremberg. After studies, he returned home to the Kingdom of Hungary.

From 1725, he was county engineer in Pressburg. He devoted most of his attention to improvement works, especially anti-flood works on the banks of the river Danube and Váh (Vág), work to secure their navigability, and regulation work near Tata. He also concerned himself with astronomy at an observatory which he had established at his home, probably the first at the territory of present-day Slovakia. (Note: In present-day Laurinská Street, Bratislava.) His astronomical observations served map-making.

In 1731, Charles III delegated him to construct maps for Bel's great work, Notitia Hungariae Novae Historico-Geographica. Mikoviny then made a significant contribution to the making of a new map of the Kingdom of Hungary. He relied on his own measurements and used a scientific method, based on four basic principles: astronomical, geometrical, magnetic, and hydrographic. Mikoviny created the first topographical maps of individual counties of the Kingdom of Hungary. He also contributed to the work with illustrations, especially views of towns and castles. Mikoviny used his own prime meridian for the Kingdom of Hungary, the meridianus Posoniensis, which passed through the northeast tower of Bratislava Castle (Hungarian: Pozsonyi Vár, German: Pressburger Schloss). (Note: A symbolic stone meridian is now placed on the Danube embankment in Bratislava.)

In 1735, he became a main royal engineer of mining towns (now located in present-day Central Slovakia (Note: Banská Štiavnica (Selmecbánya), Banská Bystrica (Besztercebánya), Kremnica (Körmöcbánya), Nová Baňa (Újbánya), Banská Belá (Bélabánya), Pukanec (Bakabánya), Ľubietová (Libetbánya).)) and was instructed to found a mining school in Banská Štiavnica (Selmecbánya) which later became the (Mining Academy). Mikoviny became the director and the first professor. He lectured on mathematics, mechanics, hydraulics, and surveying methods and supervised practical work in land and mine surveying. From 1935, he was also a member of the Prussian Academy of Sciences in Berlin. He made a significant contribution to the development of mining in Lower Hungary (today in central Slovakia) helping it to achieve a place among the most technically developed industries in Europe at that time. He was a leading expert on the construction of water reservoirs, mining machinery, foundries, and mills. His chief contribution is a construction of a sophisticated system of reservoirs (tajchy), which drained water from the flooded mines in Banská Štiavnica (Selmecbánya) and provided energy for its local industry. He closely collaborated with Maximilian and Joseph Charles Hell.

He also worked as an engineer and builder of roads and bridges. During the Silesian Wars, Empress Maria Theresa of Austria employed him as a military engineer. He designed and built defensive and fortification works on the Moravian-Silesian frontier. In 1748, he carried out regulation work in the area of Komárom (today Komárom and Komárno), and at the time devoted attention to archaeological research. He studied and described the remains of the Roman fortress of Brigetio in Szőny, and made a plan of it. Various buildings were erected according to his plans. In 1749, he prepared plans for construction of a royal palace in Buda, and carried out preparation of the castle hill and construction of water treatment works for it. In 1750, he carried out anti-flooding works on the river Váh (Vág). During the works, he became ill and died on 23 March 1750 at a now unknown place on the road from Trenčín (Trencsén) to Banská Štiavnica (Selmecbánya). He is buried at an unknown location.

== Legacy ==
Mikoviny effectively resolved the energy supply for mining machines in the region of Banská Štiavnica (Selmecbánya) for the 18th, but also for most of the 19th and the early 20th century. The artificial lake system significantly improved and extended by him is today part of UNESCO World Heritage Site. It is still in use and supplies the town with drinking water. Several Mikoniny's memorials were built in Slovakia and Hungary. A Samuel Mikovíni Prize has been presented in Slovakia since 2013, to recognize original developments resulting in significant improvements in science and technology.

== Bibliography ==
- Čižmár, Jozef (2013). Samuel Mikovíni: Významný slovenský inovátor [Samuel Mikovíni: Significant Slovak innovator] (in Slovak). Bratislava: Centrum vedecko-technických informácií SR. ISBN 978-80-89354-10-8.
- Drenko, Jozef (2010). Samuel Mikovíni: Prvý slovenský inžinier [Samuel Mikovíni: The first Slovak engineer] (in Slovak). Lučenec.
- Kamenický, Miroslav (2006). Banícke školstvo na Slovensku do založenia Baníckej akadémie v Banskej Štiavnici [Mining schools in Slovakia from the foundation of the Mining Academy in Banská Štiavnica] (in Slovak). Bratislava: Slovak Academic Press. ISBN 80-89104-83-5.
- Lichý, Ján (2016). "Samuel Mikovíni: geniálny vedec a významný vodohospodár" [Samuel Mikovíni: Genial scienstist and significant hydro engineer]. Enviromagazín (in Slovak) (1). Bratislava: Ministerstvo životného prostredia Slovenskej republiky, Slovenská agentúra životného prostredia.
- Majtán, Milan (1974). "Písanie historických priezvisk" [Transcriptions of historical surnames]. Kultúra slova (in Slovak) (6). Bratislava: Jazykovený ústav SAV. ISSN 1335-1877.
- Purgina, Ján (1958). Samuel Mikovíni (1700-1750) Život a dielo [(1700-1750) Life and work] (in Slovak). Bratislava: Správa geodézie a kartografie na Slovensku.
- Žilák, Ján (2005). Sombathyova, Magdalena (ed.). Samuel Mikovíni a jeho odkaz pre dnešok [Samuel Mikovíni and his message for today]. Banská Štiavnica: Slovenské banské múzeum. ISBN 80-89104-83-5.
- Velichová, Daniela (1 March 2007). "Z histórie matematiky a deskriptívnej geometrie na technických vysokých školách na Slovensku" [About the history of mathematics and descriptive geometry at technical universities in Slovakia] (in Slovak).
- "Samuel Mikovíni" (in Slovak). Municipality of Banská Štiavnica.
