= Štiavnické Bane =

Štiavnické Bane Hegybánya
- Municipality
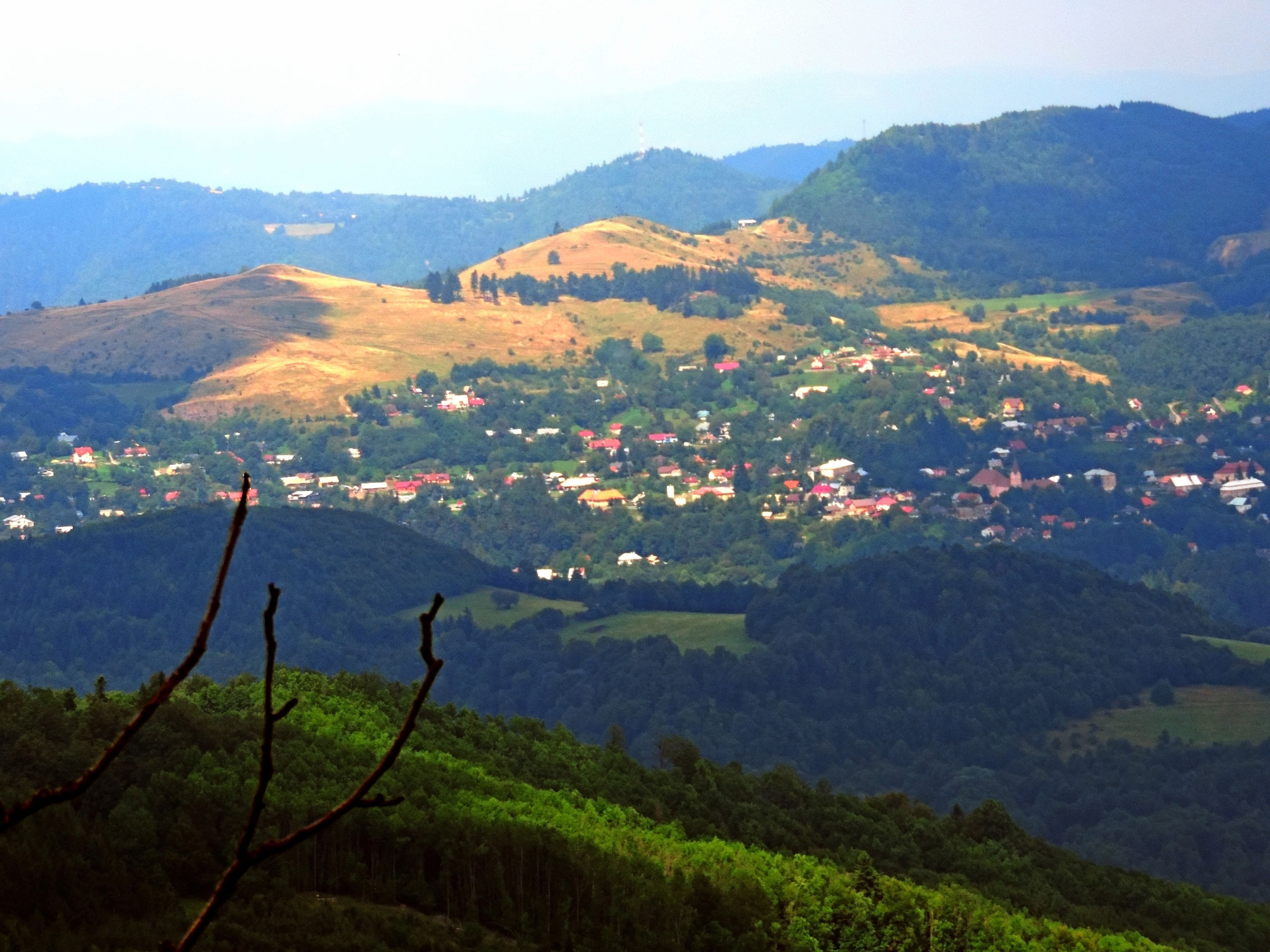

- Flag

- Location of Štiavnické Bane in the Banská Bystrica Region Location of Štiavnické Bane in Slovakia
- Coordinates: 48.44°N 18.87°E
- Country: Slovakia
- Region: Banská Bystrica Region
- District: Banská Štiavnica District
- First mentioned: 1559

Area
  - Total: 10.15 km^{2} (3.92 sq mi)
- Elevation: 670 m (2,200 ft)

Population (2025)
  - Total: 849
- Time zone: UTC+1 (CET)
  - Summer (DST): UTC+2 (CEST)
- Postal code: 969 81
- Area code: +421 45
- Vehicle registration plate (until 2022): BS
- Website: www.obecstiavnickebane.sk

Štiavnické Bane (Hungarian: Hegybánya) is a village in the Banská Štiavnica District, in the Banská Bystrica Region of Slovakia.

== Name ==
First, in 1352 it was recorded as Sygluspergh, then in 1388 as Pergh, in 1457 as Sigelsperg, in 1559 as Pergh, later as Szélakna, Windschacht and then until 1891 as Pjerg, after Hegybánya. Slovaks used Piarg until 1948, after Štiavnické Bane. Recently, Germans use the form Siegelsberg, while Hungarians use Hegybánya.

== Geography ==
The municipality lies at an altitude of 670 metres (2,200 ft) and covers an area of 10.15 km^{2} (3.92 sq mi) (2025).

== Population ==
Population statistic (10 years)
Year	1995	2005	2015	2025
Count	823	815	840	849
Difference		−0.97%	+3.06%	+1.07%

Population statistic
Year	2024	2025
Count	839	849
Difference		+1.19%

It has a population of 849 people (31 December 2025).

=== Ethnicity ===
Census 2021 (1+ %)
Ethnicity	Number	Fraction
Slovak	784	96.43%
Not found out	21	2.58%
Total	813	

In year 2021 was 813 people by ethnicity 784 as Slovak, 21 as Not found out, 7 as Czech, 2 as Austrian, 2 as German, 2 as Hungarian, 2 as Other, 1 as Ukrainian, 1 as Italian, 1 as Rusyn and 1 as Russian.

Note on population: The difference values of population numbers in the table "Population statistic" and in the sections "Ethnicity" & "Religion" is caused by the use of various statistical methods.

=== Religion ===
Census 2021 (1+ %)
Religion	Number	Fraction
Roman Catholic Church	556	68.39%
None	173	21.28%
Not found out	40	4.92%
Evangelical Church	26	3.2%
Total	813	

In year 2021 was 813 people by religion 556 from Roman Catholic Church, 173 from None, 40 from Not found out, 26 from Evangelical Church, 3 from Jehovah's Witnesses, 3 from Buddhism, 3 from Ad hoc movements, 2 from Eastern Orthodox Church, 2 from Greek Catholic Church, 1 from Old Catholic Church, 1 from Calvinist Church, 1 from Christian Congregations in Slovakia, 1 from Islam and 1 from Church of the Brethren.

== Famous people ==
Štiavnické Bane was the birthplace of the 18th century astronomer Maximilian Hell and the World War II fascist politician Vojtech Tuka, who was hanged by Czechoslovakia for his wartime crimes.
