= Ferenc Földes Gymnasium =

Secondary school in Miskolc, Hungary

Coordinates: 48.1°N 20.7833°E

- Hungarian: Földes Ferenc Gimnázium
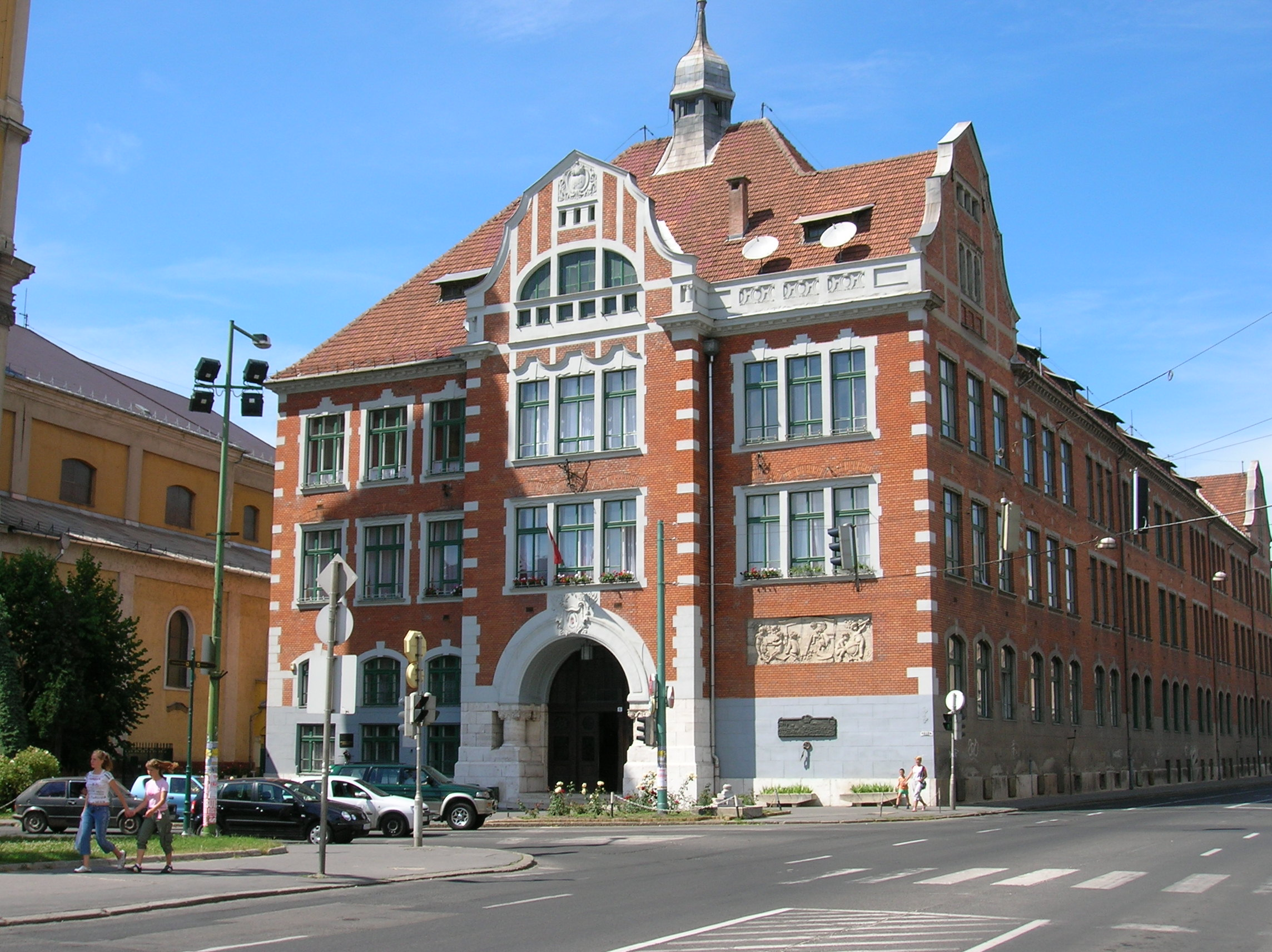

Information
- School type: Gymnasium
- Established: 1953; 73 years ago
- Principal: Róbert Fazekas

The Ferenc Földes Gymnasium (Hungarian: Földes Ferenc Gimnázium) is a secondary school in Miskolc, Hungary. It is famous for being one of the best secondary schools of the country.

== History ==
The school came into being in 1953 with the unification of György Fráter Catholic Secondary School and József Lévay Protestant Secondary School. As a successor of these renowned institutions, it has a history of more than 450 years.

The Protestant Secondary School was first mentioned in 1560 by Jenő Zoványi, in a work about the history of Protestantism in Hungary. In 1731 supervision over the school was given to the Roman Catholic Church. In 1881 the primary school was separated from the secondary school. In 1944, during the German occupation of the country the building was used for military purposes, and the school could move back only in 1946. On July 15, 1948, like all other schools in Hungary at the time, it was expropriated by the State.

The other predecessor, the Catholic Secondary School was founded in 1729 by Didák Kelemen, a member of the Conventual Friars Minor. Its first building was a small one with only two classrooms. It stood on today's Kazinczy Street, not far from the present building of the school. During the following 100 years, the institution had to move several times, since its building was destroyed for various reasons on numerous occasions. During the war of independence in 1848–49 the building was used as part of a military hospital. The big flood of 1878 damaged the building, and the school lost its library of several thousand books.

In 1886 it went into state property, and was renamed Royal Catholic Secondary School. Between 1910 and 1911 the new building of the school – designed by Gyula Orczy – was built on Heroes Square and the same building is used by the school since then.

From 1914 to 1916 there was a military hospital in the building. In 1922 the school took the name of György Fráter because of a new law made in the previous year mandating that all secondary schools have to be named after important persons in Hungarian history. In 1936 it already had 946 students, which made it the second-largest school in Hungary.

During World War II a military hospital used the building again, and in 1944 it was hit by a bomb. The school could move back only in 1945, but in 1949 it had to move out again, because the Ministry gave the building to the newly formed Technical University (the predecessor of today's University of Miskolc.) In 1952 the university moved to the newly built district, University Town, and the secondary school – which took the name of Ferenc Földes in 1950 – got its building back.

In 1953 the two schools were united. The school bears the name of Földes ever since then, except for a short period during the Revolution in 1956, when it bore the name of István Széchenyi. Since the end of the Socialist era (1989) there have been debates about changing the school's name, mostly because Földes was a Communist.

In 1991 the Földes Secondary School was the first secondary school of the city to start six-year courses. (In the past decades Hungarian children spent 8 years in primary school, which was followed by 4 years in secondary school. In the 1990s several secondary schools started six-year courses, where students could apply after they've spent six years in primary school, and eight-year courses, where they could apply after 4 years in primary school – see Education in Hungary for further details. Currently, Földes Secondary School does not plan to start eight-year courses.)

In the early 2000s, the school received government funding and was able to expand the building. This solved the problem of insufficient space in the building, which previously compounded by the introduction of six-year courses and dividing students into smaller groups for foreign language classes. The new wing has a new gym, larger and more modern than the three gyms in the old part of the building, and a larger library. Construction was finished in 2003.

Among the traditions of the school are the Földes Ball and the "Day of Culture" when students perform plays and music.
