= The Pécs Model of School Social Work =

Model for social work

The Pécs Model of School Social Work is a model for social work that was developed in the city of Pécs, Hungary, by INDIT Közalapítvány, a Hungarian non-governmental organisation. The model is aimed at helping pupils acquire social competences. According to this model, the school social worker gets and keeps in touch both with the child, the family and the school. Within the Pécs model the school social worker is employed by an NGO independent from the school. The NGO builds and co-ordinates a network of the school social workers and supervises their work. The school social workers work full-time in their schools. Most of their work time is spent there; except when they visit families, do case management work, or partake in team discussions. They have their own office in the school, which makes them known as a member and supporter of the school community (Felvinczi 2007:38).

== History ==
An important stage in the development of the Pécs model was when the prevention team of INDIT Közalapítvány got acquainted with school social work services already functioning well in the city of Pécs and in county Baranya. In 2003, a school social worker and a child protection professional joined the prevention team. Soon afterward, a need for the application of school social work was suggested at several professional forums, such as the Conciliatory Forum on Drug Policies, the Child Protection Workshop and the Roundtable on Social Policy.

A study carried out in 2004 by Tihanyi and Gergál on child protection work done at schools and on the prospects of social work at local schools also played an important role in the formation of the program. The study pointed out that 60 percent of teachers involved in the research would consider the presence of a social professional at school as necessary. Moreover, 74 percent would consult such a professional on a weekly basis. The research study also found that 50 percent of child protection workers would welcome professionals with a degree and work experience in social work to take the job over from them (Tihanyi 2004:53). INDIT Közalapítvány took the initiative in spreading school social work in Hungary.

The program was launched in academic year 2006 / 2007 in three secondary schools in Pécs. In academic year 2008 / 2009, three further schools (an eight-class grammar school, a primary school and a vocational school) joined the project. Thus, the Network of School Social Workers of INDIT Közalapítvány employs full-time school social workers in six schools at present.

=== INDIT Közalapítvány ===
INDIT Közalapítvány maintains an integrated therapeutic system, which comprises several institutions (a drug abuse prevention and training center, two outpatient and a residential drug abuse treatment centres, day clinics, halfway houses), low threshold community services and outreach programs (TÉR Community Service, street social work services, ALTERNATIVE Youth Office, Party Service). Associated teams and NGOs (Drug Abuse Prevention Team Association, Network of School Social Workers, Mérföldkő Association) also contribute to the integrated system. INDIT Közalapítvány applies a complex approach to the treatment of addictions. Ensures easy access to services designed to meet individual needs. The Közalapítvány also focuses on prevention and attitude formation of communities.

Integrated therapeutic systems of the above nature are able to give the most adequate answers to the clients' problems due to their vertically and horizontally interconnected and coherent structure of services. Outreach and prevention programs are more effective, street social workers are more confident than they would be without the background treatment facilities. Risk of a client's dropping out of treatment is reduced significantly.

The system is undergoing a permanent development as problems associated with addictions change. Effective solutions can only be provided by a team with a reliable professional background and an open and creative spirit (Szemelyácz 2005). The non-governmental status also makes it possible for the organization to deliver services quickly and in an innovative and flexible manner. Organizational structure of the therapeutic system is a so-called "provision pyramid", which ensures the cost effectiveness of continuous therapeutic interventions and caretaking.

=== School social work ===
The first school social work programs were launched in Hungary in the early 1990s. "School social work is an activity that helps schoolchildren develop their skills and reach their full potential through the improvement of their social relations and their integration into community" (Bányai 2000).

School social work is planned to prevent children from becoming endangered and to contribute to their being brought up in their own families. School social work handles problems arising in various systems (families, groups of children, communities) in a complex way by the help of social work techniques. It is primarily preventive in nature. School social work empowers pupils; it gives them ways to get to know themselves and to become able to resolve social problems of their own and those occurring in their environment (MGYSZOE 2005).

=== Network of School Social Workers ===
The World Health Organization considers health as not merely the lack of illness, but as a balanced state of physical, mental and social well-being (Ajkai, 1996).

Thus, traditional interpretation of prevention is being revised. Drug use related health promotion for example might be aimed at reducing risk factors leading to drug consumption. The most important protective factors are the following: self-esteem, the feeling of responsibility, and the belief that one is able to accomplish one's dreams and to have one's way. These may result from academic success, firm social support, or from the positive outcomes of life transitions (Rácz 2001: 57–62). The network programme is designed to strengthen the protective factors mentioned.

We need the potent supportive presence of professionals. Multidisciplinarity is an essential element of social work. The notion of an educating school is gradually changing (Buda 2000, Gyenge 2000). Much more knowledge is to be imparted nowadays than was earlier. Academic requirements for pupils have been increasing, schools themselves have become stressors and potential risk factors. Besides the altering relationship between schools and society, due to individualization the role of peers in socialization has been increasing and peer groups has partly been taking the place of the family. Schools remained the only settings where factors influencing children can be controlled (Buda 2000:17).

The programme uses the school social work models developed in the United States in the late 1960s, first described by Alderson:

- Basic assumption of the traditional clinical model is that the child has problems due to the dysfunctions of the family. In the clinical model, school social workers work with students and family members applying primarily casework methods supplemented by group methods. The model is aimed at the development of a supportive cooperation. This deals less with the school.
- The school change model is aimed at identifying and changing dysfunctional norms and conditions of the school.
- Community school model: targets disadvantaged communities, which, in their opinion, misunderstand and distrust school.
- Social interaction model: focuses mainly on the interaction between the behavior of individuals and groups. Interventions are aimed to affect the quality and type of the interactions.

The above models underwent further development in Germany in the 1980s. Child-oriented school social work applies a preventive approach to find solutions to children's problems. School social work acts as an autonomous institution. Social workers keep in close touch with families and pay frequent visits to them.

The above approach together with the ecological model worked up in the mid-1990s by Florance Costin influenced the Pécs model. The model is intended to help pupils acquire social competences and to sensitize schools to the needs of children. The social worker is in contact both with the child, the family and the school, focuses on the whole, and considers the complexity of the personality and the environment at the same time. She / he basically concentrates on health. She / he endeavours to find and make use of resources in order to surmount environmental constraints (Costin, quoted by Balikó 2000). Construction of a positive lifestyle can be facilitated through weakening risk factors and strengthening protective factors. In Hungary, protective factors can hardly compensate for risk factors affecting young people. The Pécs model employs school social workers in state-owned schools in the city of Pécs.

Modern ecological approach integrates the theory of protective and risk factors and studies on resilience carried out in the last two decades. Resilience refers to successful adaptation, an ability to exploit positive features of the environment, and the positive ways people respond to stress (Wang, Haertel, & Walberg, 1999, quoted by Gleason-Erin T 2007). Resilience refers to individual, familial, and environmental characteristics that modify risk and allow children to thrive despite at-risk circumstances (Fergus & Zimmerman, 2005; quoted by Gleason-Erin T 2007). Educational resilience theory recognizes that overlapping ecological contexts of family, school, peer, and community are interdependent and that they all affect learning (Fraser;Wang et al. quoted by Gleason-Erin T 2007).

== Services ==
=== Individual counselling and case management ===
- counselling for pupils experiencing hardships at school or undergoing difficult life events
- counselling for pupils in conflict with teachers or vice versa
- career advising
- acting for pupils at official procedures, assistance in the resolution of social problems, advising on application for grants
- enabling parents to handle their child's academic failure or behavioral problems at school, improving parenting skills
- referring pupils and parents to specialized services (specialized advisory offices, youth bureaus, child protection services, employment agencies, drug abuse treatment centres etc.)
- mediation between parents and children

=== Services provided for parents and families ===
- Counselling and life management coaching for families
- Attendance at teacher–parent meetings

=== Social group work ===
- Social group work for pupils with specific needs and for heterogeneous groups
- Building good relations among classmates via group techniques
- Seminars for pupils on different topics
- Career orientation groups

=== Community social work ===
- Co-operation with pupils' governments
- Co-operation with youth-assistance groups in certain districts of town
- Co-operation with parent–teacher associations
- Introducing and organizing community events (film clubs, tea-rooms) for pupils
- Planning and organizing free-time activities and programmes strengthening social solidarity
- Participation in school excursions and trips, contribution to days of education
- Organizing further education for teachers

Target groups of the school social work programme are schoolchildren, their families and anyone connected to pupils in some way.

Within the Pécs model professionals apply the following techniques of social work: individual case management (counselling, advising); group work (education of group members, improving their social relations, prevention), and community social work.

== Summary ==
- The employer is a civil organization independent from the school and the child welfare system (independence). Benefits: the professional work is not affected by the hierarchical circumstances.
- The school social workers work in a network providing professional control and support (case discussions, uniform administration, work diary, circulation report, social forms, individual problem solving designs). To ensure effective work in the schools, they hold weekly case discussions, whose aim is professional support; in addition, there are so-called expanded or open case discussions every month (network).
- The school social workers work full-time in their school, most of their work time is spent there; the exceptions are when they visit families, hold case managements, or partake in team discussions. They have their own office in the school (with computer and direct telephone). This makes them easily available to students; an adult who helps them and gives them emotional support (availability).
- According to the global approach, it is possible that different methods of work are given priority in the different schools (e.g. practicing secondary school – group work, polytechnic school – teamwork, trade school – individual case treatment) (flexibility).
- The model develops close cooperation with other youth helping programs in non-school settings, in fact many of these programs work within the INDIT Foundation: Alternatíva Ifjúsági Iroda (Alternative Youth Office – the first so-called Plaza program in Hungary), Street Social Service, BuliSegély (harm reduction for drug users in party settings). The integrated functioning of these many different programs makes it possible for the system to reach dropouts and other youth unreachable from the school (cooperation).
- Individual professional consultation in every school at least once a month, whose aim is the "tailor-made" professional support of the social workers (consultation).
- The social workers try to function as a part of a health promoting work team (school nurse, school doctor, school psychologist, program organizer, person responsible for youth protection, homeroom teacher, etc.) and also try to promote these kinds of teams (team).
- During the program, an important part is given to the measuring of effectiveness (administration, publicity) (effectiveness).
- Program framework: derived from the child-orientated school social work and the modern ecology models. The school social worker tries to find a solution for the child's problem in a preventive way, through his own methods – individual case treatment, social group work, community work. The school social work is a separate institution acting in an autonomous way, it is not subordinate to the school management, it is financed by an independent employer and is supported by supervision teams and case discussions. It is in connection with the child, the family and the school, concentrates on the whole, and takes into account the complexity of the environment and personality. During his work, the social worker concentrates on the strengths of his clients, tries to strengthen the protective factors, but knows about the complexity of the problems and the variety of professions possible in their treatment. The solution in searched for with the help of a multidisciplinary team (scientificity).

== See also ==
- Education in Hungary
- School social work in Hungary
