= Green ribbon =

Symbol of various advocacy campaigns

The green ribbon can have a variety of symbolic meanings.

== Mitochondrial disease ==
Mitochondrial disease awareness is represented by a green ribbon. Mitochondrial disease (mito) is a debilitating genetic disorder that robs the body's cells of energy, causing multiple organ dysfunction or failure and potentially death. There are many forms of mitochondrial disease; it is highly complex and can affect anyone of any age. Mitochondrial disease can cause any symptom in any organ at any age. There are currently no cures and few effective treatments.

== Cerebral palsy ==
Cerebral palsy (CP) awareness is represented by a green ribbon. CP is one of the most common childhood disabilities and represents a wide range of fine and gross motor function impairment, mental delay and other combinations caused by injury to the brain through trauma, lack of oxygen at birth or another cause.

== Mental health ==
Mental health awareness is represented by a green ribbon. Wearing a green ribbon in mental health advocacy symbolizes hope, emotional support, and solidarity with individuals experiencing mental health challenges, helping to foster communication and reduce stigma.

== Kidney disease ==
Kidney disease and kidney cancer awareness are another cause represented by the green ribbon. People who have kidney disease, are on dialysis, have received a kidney transplant, or who are living kidney donors wear the green ribbon to help raise awareness about the condition. March is kidney awareness month and those who are affected by the kidney disease or would like to support the cause and raise awareness, are encouraged to wear the ribbon all month long.

== Levellers and early Whig radicals ==
In 17th century England during and after the English Civil War the wearing of a sea-green ribbon symbolized affiliation with the ideals of the Levellers and later in the century with radical Whiggism. The green ribbon and sprigs of rosemary were symbols of support for the Levellers during the English Civil War and English Interregnum. At the funeral of Thomas Rainsborough (a Member of Parliament and also a Leveller leader who had spoken at the Putney Debates) there were thousands of mourners wearing the Levellers' ribbons of sea-green and bunches of rosemary for remembrance in their hats, as there were the next year, 1649, at the funeral of Robert Lockyer a New Model Army Agitator executed by Oliver Cromwell for mutiny.

The Green Ribbon Club was one of the earliest of the loosely combined associations which met from time to time in London taverns or coffee-houses for political purposes in the 17th century. It had its meeting place at the King's Head tavern at Chancery Lane End, so was known as the King's Head Club. It seems to have been founded about the year 1675 as a resort for members of the political party hostile to the court. As these associates were in the habit of wearing in their hats a bow, or bob, of green ribbon, as a distinguishing badge useful for the purpose of mutual recognition in street brawls, the name of the club was changed, about 1679, to the Green Ribbon Club. The 'Green Ribbon' was the badge of The Levellers in the English Civil Wars in which many of the members had fought and was an overt reminder of their radical origins.

== Support of farm families ==
In 1998, Margaret Bruce, a Pastoral Associate at St. John the Evangelist Catholic Church in North Dakota, sought a way to support farm families and came up with the idea of a green ribbon and a card that read "We care through prayer." Around the same time, the National Catholic Rural Life Conference (NCRLC) began receiving emergency calls from farm families in stress and saw that the situation was getting worse across the country. In November 1998, NCRLC launched the Green Ribbon Campaign at their 75th anniversary meeting. They developed and began to disseminate rural crisis packets to help parishes deal with the growing rural crisis.

== HIV/AIDS ==
In the UK, in November 2008, a Manchester-based support group for people living with or being affected by HIV/AIDS; launched a campaign called Body Positive North West, using a green ribbon as their symbol. The aim is to raise awareness of 60 second HIV testing and encourage more people to get themselves screened for HIV, as research suggests that over a third of all HIV-infected people in Britain, are themselves unaware of this.

== Green ribbon ceremony in Slovakia ==
There is a Stužková slávnosť in Slovak secondary schools, which takes place before the matura. During this event the green ribbons are pinned on the formal vested students by the class teacher. After ceremony there is gala banquet. The green ribbon is meant to be a hope to help students pass the matura.

== Awareness of other political and cultural issues ==
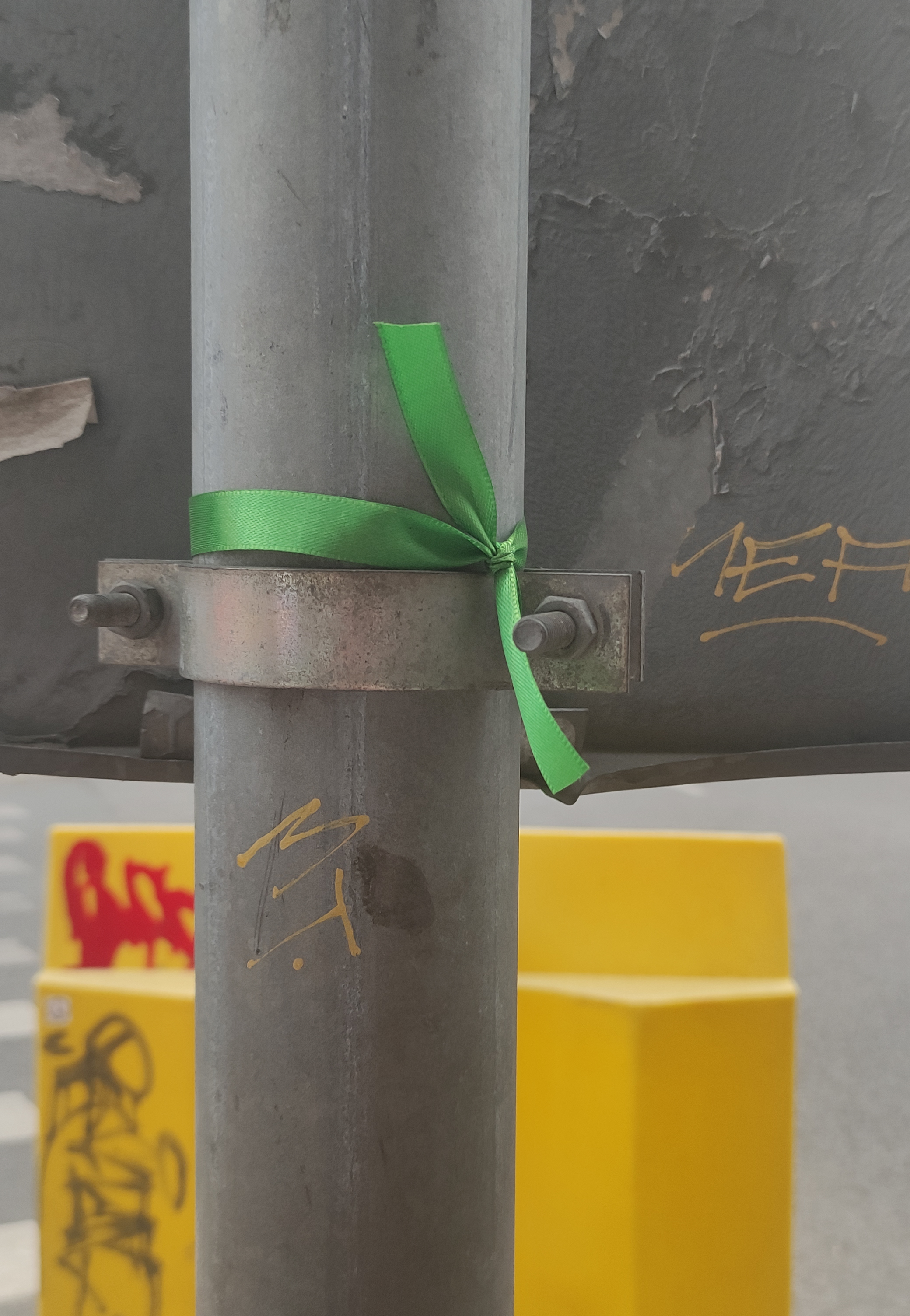
Green ribbon used as a sign against the Russian invasion of Ukraine

- Following the July 2005 London bombings, British police in Nottinghamshire distributed green ribbons as part of a Good Faith campaign to show support for Muslim communities.
- A green ribbon draped around the symbol for the game Quake was used to raise awareness of sexual discrimination against female players.
- In Iran the green ribbon was used as a sign of support for Mir-Hossein Mousavi in 2009 Iranian presidential election, a color which has since become pervasive in Iran.
- Centrist camp and fringe localist which don't associate with pro-democracy camp and pro-Beijing camp in Hong Kong.
- In Russia, the green ribbon is used as a sign of anti-war protests against the Russian invasion of Ukraine starting in 2022, usually not displayed on person as St. George ribbon.
- South Korean families and surviving victims of the 2023 Osong Bus Flooding have adopted lime green as the memorial ribbon for the families and victim's civic group.

== Awareness of health and safety issues ==
Green ribbons have been used to promote awareness for many diseases and causes.

- Donation and transplant: Bone marrow donation, kidney donation, living organ donation, organ donation, organ transplantation, stem cell donation and research, tissue donation, bronchiolitis obliterans (common after lung transplants)
- Mental health/illness: Bipolar disorder/manic depression, depression, childhood depression
- Nervous system issues: cerebral palsy, neurofibromatosis, neural tube defects, spinal cord injury and research, Tourette syndrome, traumatic brain injury
- Eye issues: Eye injury prevention, glaucoma
- Kidney and adrenal issues: Kidney disease, kidney cancer, renal cell carcinoma, adrenal cancer, nephrotic syndrome, Fanconi syndrome,
- Congenital disorders: Dwarfism, fibrodysplasia ossificans progressiva, mitochondrial disease, primary sclerosing cholangitis, prune belly syndrome, Von Hippel–Lindau disease
- Gastroparesis
- Intellectual disability
- Missing children
- Worker safety
- Safe driving & pedestrian safety

== Other shades of green ribbons ==
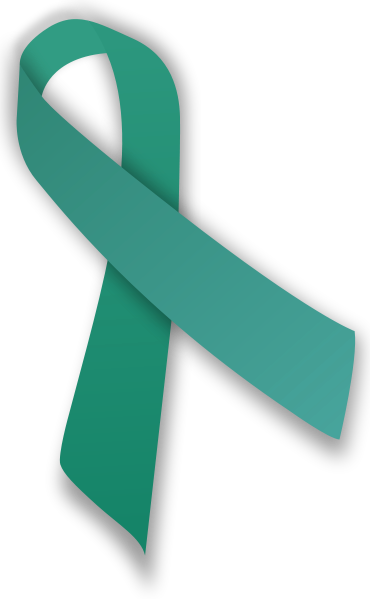
Jade ribbon

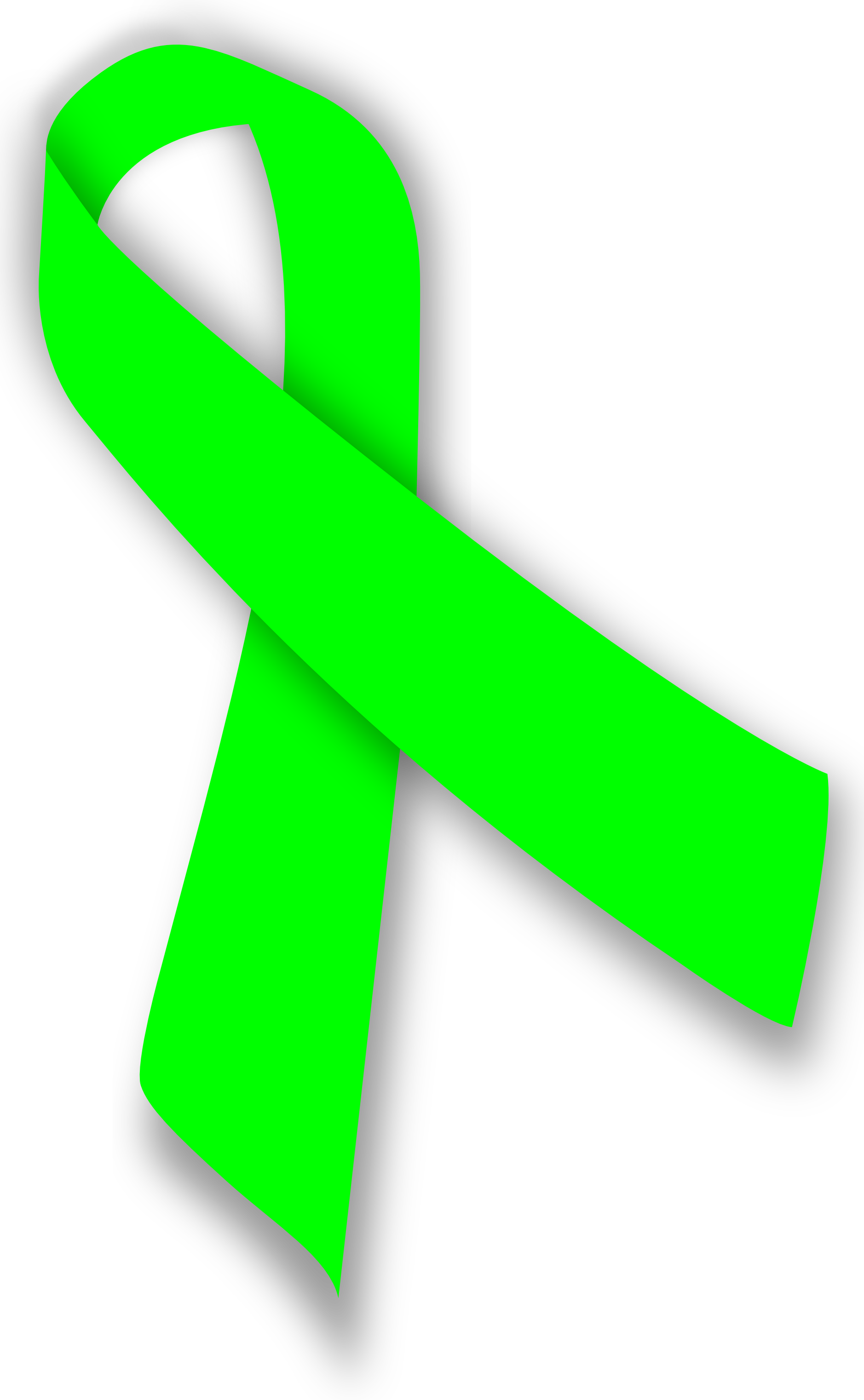
Lime ribbon

Teal ribbon

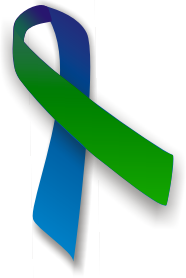
Green & blue ribbon
- Jade ribbon: hepatitis B and liver cancer, especially in Asian and Pacific Islander communities
- Light green ribbon: Celiac disease, chronic pelvic pain, human papillomavirus and Sexually transmitted infections
- Lime green ribbon: Cyclin-dependent kinase-like 5 (CDKL5), Duchenne muscular dystrophy, gastroschisis, Kabuki syndrome, Lyme disease, lymphoma, muscular dystrophy, non-Hodgkin lymphoma, Sandhoff disease, spinal cord injury, achalasia
- Mint green ribbon: Autosomal recessive polycystic kidney disease, congenital hepatic fibrosis, genetic disorders, Ivemark Syndrome
- Teal ribbon: Anti-bullying awareness, agoraphobia, anxiety disorder, Batten disease, cervical cancer, Arnold–Chiari malformation, congenital diaphragmatic hernia, dissociative identity disorder, ectodermal dysplasia, fibular hemimelia, food allergies, fragile X syndrome, gynecological cancers, hoarding, interstitial cystitis, knee injury, military sexual trauma, myasthenia gravis, obsessive–compulsive disorder, ovarian cancer, panic disorder, polycystic kidney disease, polyendocrine metabolic ovarian syndrome (PMOS), posttraumatic stress disorder, progressive supranuclear palsy, proximal femoral focal deficiency, rape, scleroderma, sexual assault, substance abuse, Tourette syndrome, trigeminal neuralgia, tsunami victims, uterine cancer and vulvar cancer
- Turquoise ribbon: Addiction recovery, Bone tumors, congenital diaphragmatic hernia, dysautonomia, interstitial cystitis, Native American reparation and renal cell carcinoma
- Sea green ribbon: Stuttering
- Mixed ribbons: Anal cancer (green & blue), cervical cancer (teal & white), domestic violence and sexual assault (teal & purple), hypotonia (lime green, blue, & pink), MEF2C haploinsufficiency syndrome (lime green & black, with DNA strand), medullary sponge kidney (purple, teal & green), pseudotumor cerebri (green & blue), schizencephaly (green & purple), Stickler syndrome (green & purple), thyroid cancer (pink, purple & teal)

== See also ==
- Medals of Honor (Japan)
- Jade Ribbon Campaign
- Turquoise ribbon
