= International Review of Curriculum and Assessment Frameworks Internet Archive =

The International Review of Curriculum and Assessment Frameworks Internet Archive (INCA) was a website that provided regularly updated descriptions of education policies in 21 countries worldwide between 1996 and 2013. The site included information on the education systems of Australia, Canada, England, France, Germany, Hungary, Ireland, Italy, Japan, the Netherlands, New Zealand, Northern Ireland, Scotland, Singapore, South Africa, South Korea, Spain, Sweden, Switzerland, the United States and Wales. The primary focuses of the archive were curriculum, assessment and initial frameworks for training teachers at schools with children ages 3–19. The website was funded by the Qualifications and Curriculum Development Agency (QCDA) with content managed by the National Foundation for Educational Research (NFER).
