= Ballagás =

Hungarian ceremony

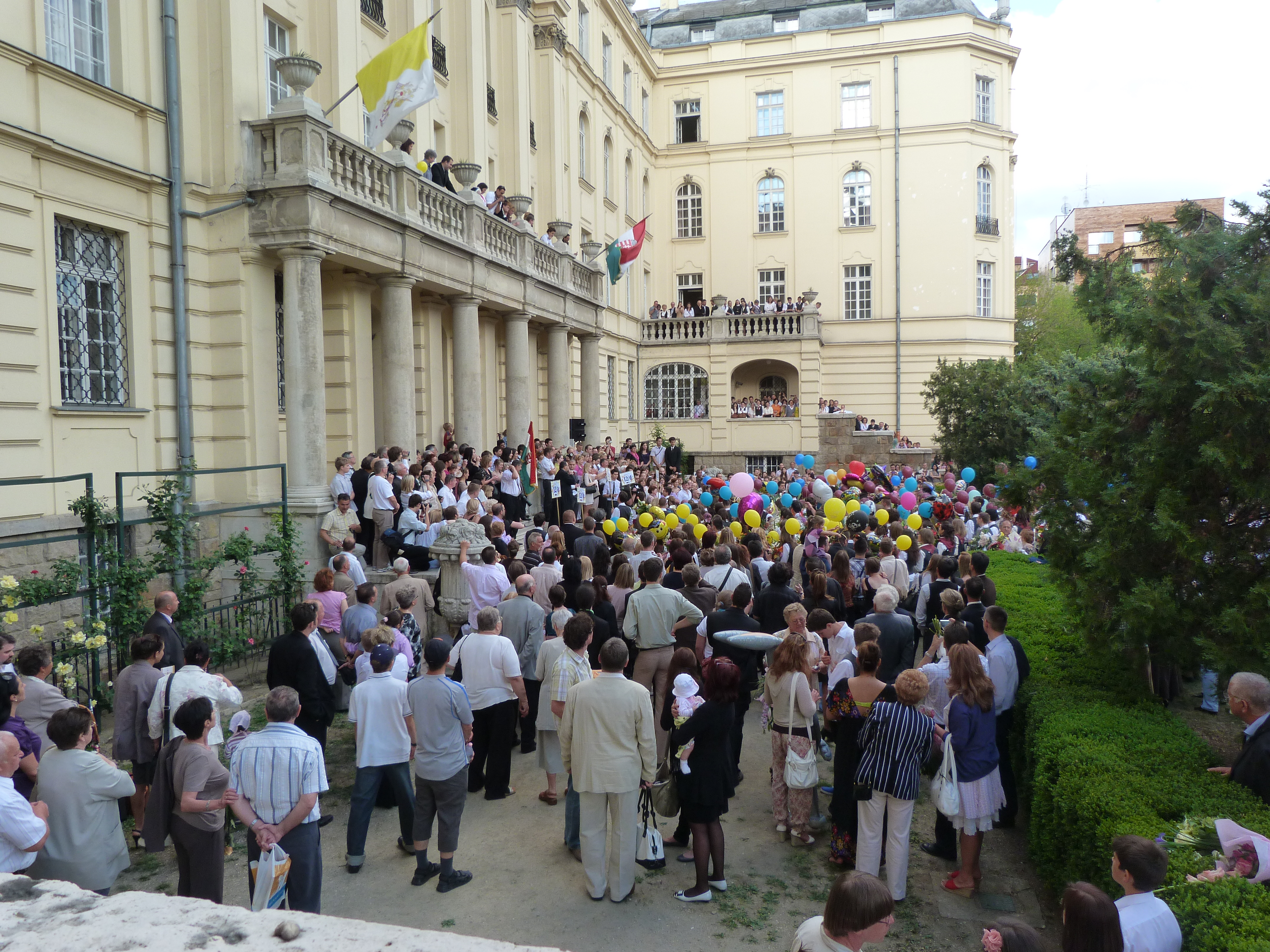
Ballagás in the Szent Margit High School, Budapest

The Ballagás (literally "slow walk") is a Hungarian ceremony held when students complete their final year of secondary school (gymnasium). It is a farewell event for students who are about to take their matura exam (érettségi), marking the end of their school years.

Children leaving kindergarten or primary school usually have a smaller Ballagás celebration. This event should not be confused with homecomings, which are called találkozó or osztálytalálkozó bál in Hungary, while proms are called érettségi bankett.

== History ==
In Hungary, the custom of Ballagás began in Selmecbánya in the 1870s, when students of the local forestry and mining academy sang a song starting with Ballag már a vén diák... ("The old student now walks on...") as a farewell to their school. This gave the tradition its name, Ballagás. However, the holiday itself and its associated customs developed later.

The customs were heavily influenced by the world of Hungarian folk tales, associating leaving school with the image of wandering, a common theme in such stories. This tradition soon spread across the country, gaining popularity throughout the 20th century.

Since the 1920s, the Hungarian folk song Elmegyek, elmegyek ("I'm leaving, I'm leaving") and Gaudeamus igitur have been sung during the ceremony. Additionally, final-year students began the tradition of serenading their teachers on the night before graduation, a practice that continues to this day.

Before the university traditions, the folk festival known as Legényavató ("legény Inauguration") symbolized coming of age in Hungarian culture. While the tradition still exists, it is less common today.

== Traditions ==
The Ballagás ceremony is widely practiced in Hungary, within the Hungarian diaspora, and among large Hungarian communities in neighboring countries. It typically takes place in late May or early June, often during Matura Week.

The day before Ballagás, younger students prepare the classrooms for the celebration. They create paper decorations and cutouts, write farewell messages on the boards, and adorn the stairs and walls with colorful flowers to bid farewell to their graduating peers and celebrate this milestone of change. They also help with the farewell speeches (or ballagási búcsú), where they often quote poems about change in front of the school and say goodbye.

They take their last homeroom class (or osztályfőnöki) with their class-masters, where students are given advice about their future, and can thank their class-masters for the help they gave them.

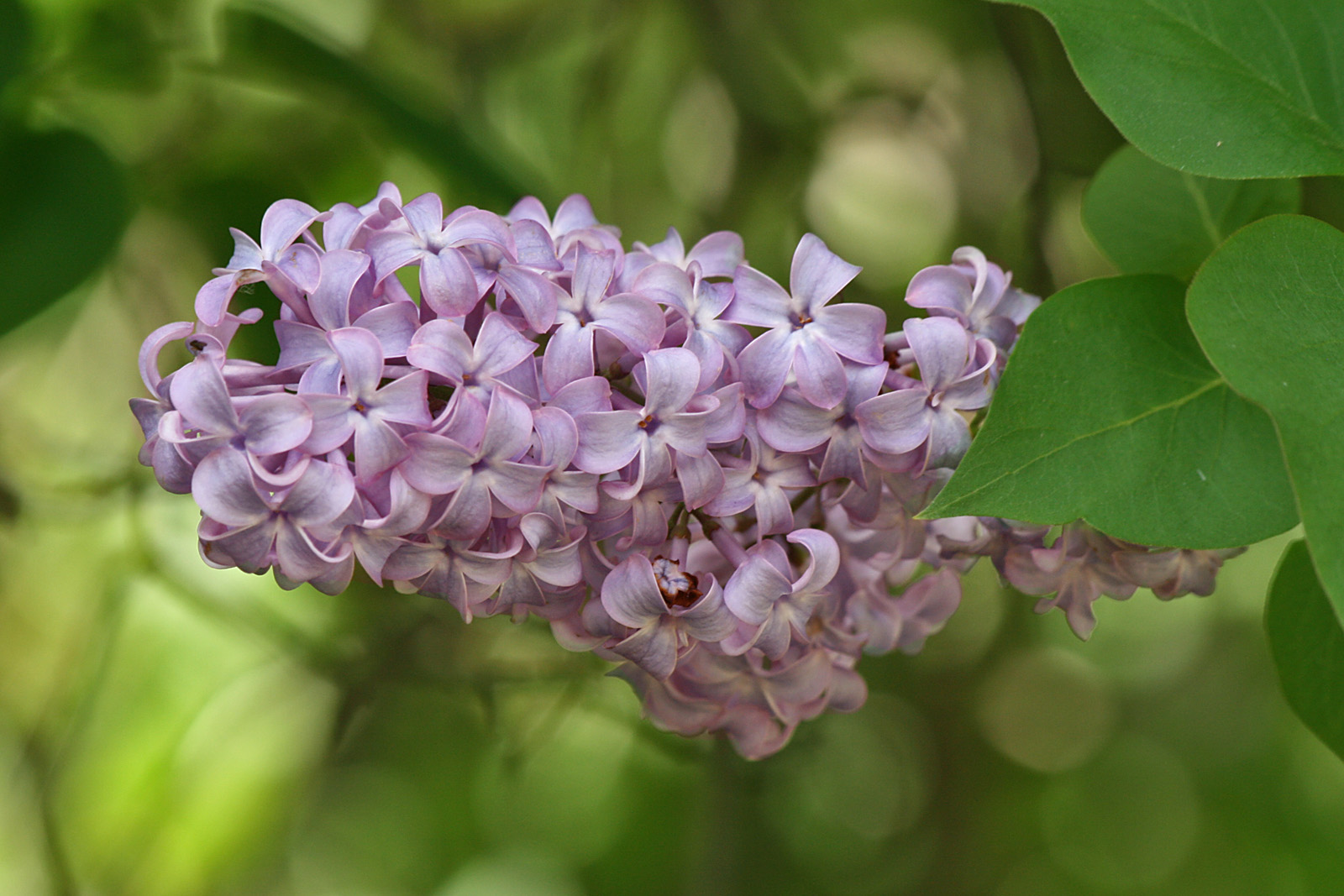
The lilac branches are stuck on boards, windows, stair handrails.

One of the main symbols of Ballagás is the lilac. Students typically decorate the entire interior of the school with these flowers, often brought in by wheelbarrow. The lilac symbolically represents guidance through life. Since the decorations use fresh flowers, they must be removed after a few days.

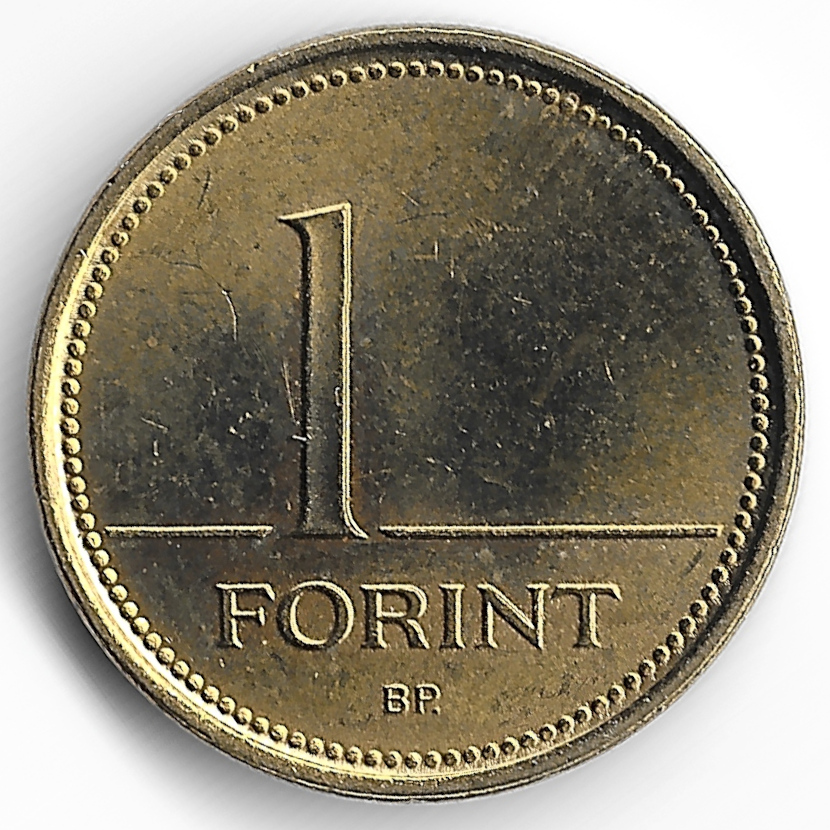
1 Hungarian forint. The lucky forint is said to bring prosperity to the students.

On the day of Ballagás, students dressed in uniforms march through the school corridors and classrooms, and sometimes nearby streets, following the flag bearer. A special satchel called the ballagó tarisznya is hung on their shoulders, symbolically identifying the student as a wanderer.

The satchel is filled with items such as hamuban sült pogácsa (ashes-baked scones), salt, soil, a lucky forint (szerencse forint), and a photo of the institution, sometimes along with a flask of water or wine. These items are usually prepared by younger students. The ballagó tarisznya and the pogácsa represent the journey of wandering, the soil from the school grounds symbolizes home, and the pinch of salt signifies the flavor and challenges that make life meaningful.

Parents and relatives greet the graduating students with balloons, bouquets, and other gifts, which the students carry as they march. During the school ceremony, some members of the class reminisce about memorable moments from the past years, and teachers offer advice for life ahead.

The students march in columns, holding bouquets and érettségi balloons in one hand while placing the other hand on the shoulder of the person in front of them. At the head of each column is the class teacher.

In the past, the classes would collectively carry the Ballagóláda, a chest where students stored memorabilia from their school years.

While new songs, such as Húsz év múlva ("20 Years From Now"), have become popular, traditional songs like the folk tune Elindultam szép hazámból ("I have set off from my beautiful homeland") are still commonly sung.

A modern tradition involves releasing helium balloons together at the end of the event, symbolizing the freedom of adult life and letting go of childhood, and making time capsules.

There are also regional traditions. For example, since 1922, students at the Evangelical Lyceum of Sopron have gone on a hike in the forest wearing their suits, where they drink spring water as part of the celebration.

The tanárbúcsúztató ("Teachers' Farewell") is typically held on the same day. During this event, students deliver speeches and present gifts to their teachers at a banquet to express their gratitude and admiration. Following the ceremony, parents often organize a family gathering, which usually takes the form of a celebratory lunch or dinner.

The Ballagás itself holds symbolic meaning: the graduates bid farewell not only to their school but also to their past lives, marking the end of an era and the beginning of a new chapter. Ballagás symbolizes the end of childhood and the transition to adulthood, making it a significant event for both the graduates (during the brief period known as ballagó) and their parents.

== Szalagavató and Bolondballagás ==
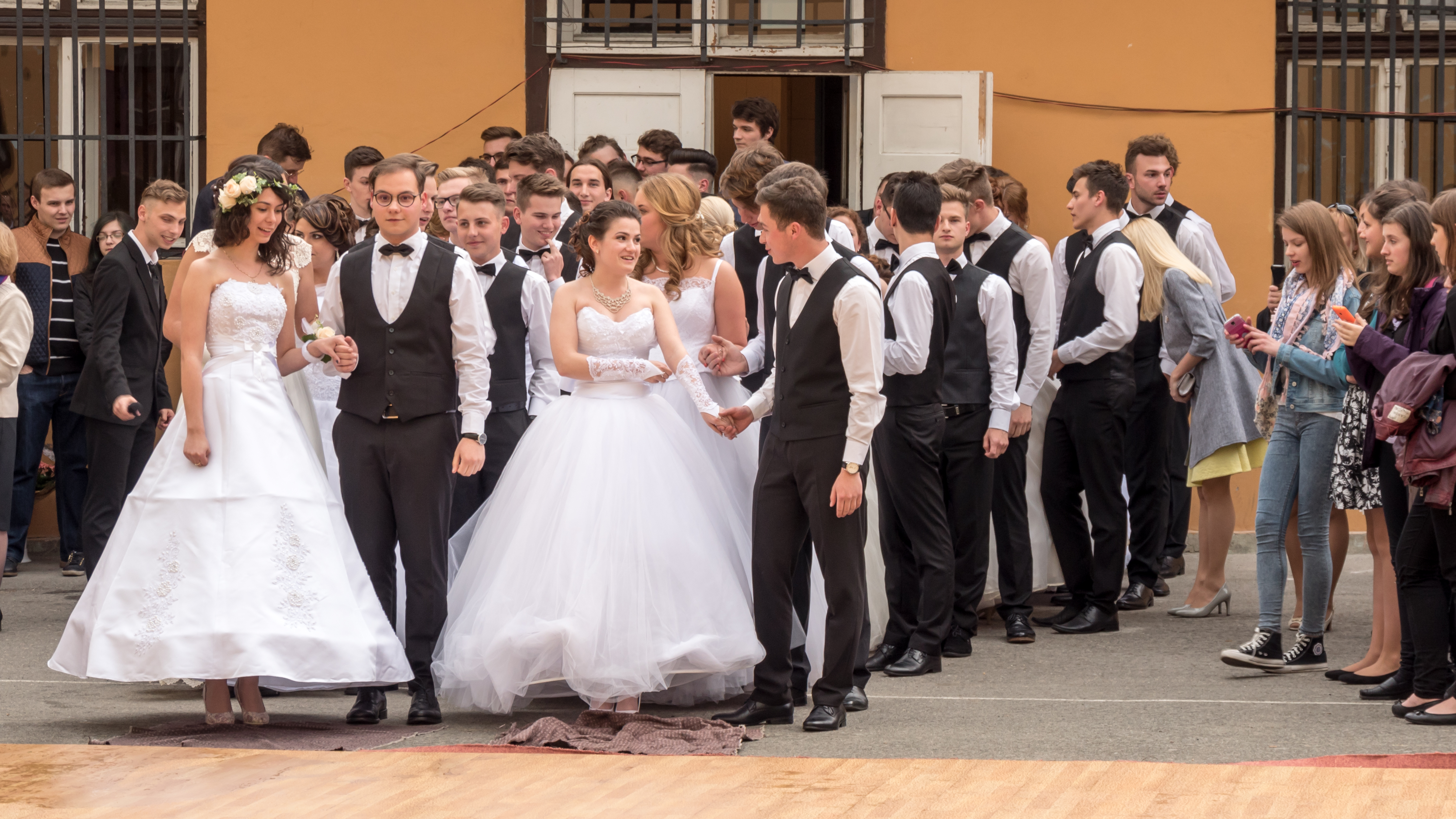
High Schoolers dancing in on their Szallagavató wearing Ball gown.

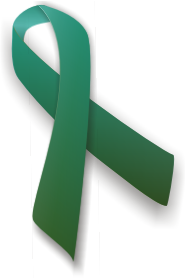
A green ribbon, which is placed on the dress of each student.

There are other traditions connected to maturity, such as the Szalagavató or Szalagtűző, which is a winter ball for students. During this event, seniors (végzős) dance as a class in formal attire. Students often give flowers to their parents, and the class typically spends nearly a year practicing for the event. A choreographer is usually hired to guide the dance, which often includes classic dances like the waltz and the palotás, after which they are all given a stem of rose. The evening show is attended by parents, teachers and junior year students, after which they share a champagne together.

Modern dances are uncommon, and are usually reserved for the osztálytánc or class dance, a dance show before the szalagavató dance, orchestrated for the parents, usually in a less formal manner. It is performed on stage often with the help of the class below them.

Students are expected to wear formal attire, suits and neckties or tuxedos, rarely tailcoat for boys, and various types of gowns for girls.

The name Szalagavató means "ribbon inauguration." During the ceremony, a green ribbon (though schools now allow other colors as well) is pinned to the chest or shoulders of each student (this part of the ceremony is called the szalagtűzés), usually by a family member but originally by their professor or class-master. The green ribbon is inscribed with the start and end dates of their high school years and symbolizes the transition to adulthood. After the Szalagavató, there is usually an after-party.

While the Ballagás traditions are exclusive to Hungary, the Szalagavató spread throughout the Kingdom of Hungary. As a result, it is not only practiced by Hungarian communities but also by Slovaks; it is known as stužková slávnosť in Slovak.

The tradition traces its origins to the Hungarian school traditions of Selmec. Originally, it was called valétálás, a term derived from the Latin word valetas (farewell). Today, valétálás refers to the special graduation ceremony practiced by Hungarian universities.

After receiving their green velvet bows from their mentors (traditionally called keresztszülők or godparents in Hungarian), the students would then proceed to the town gate, led by the oldest student, who carried a bunch of oak leaves on a stick. The others had oak leaves pinned to their hats. Younger students accompanied them, carrying torches. Upon reaching the city limits, they would kick the graduates' buttocks to symbolize that they no longer belonged there. Afterward, the students returned to dance and enjoy a night of celebration.

Other balls are also customary, including the matura ball and the iskolabál.

Days before the Ballagás, a Bolond Ballagás is also commonly held. It is a parody of the upcoming ceremony, where seniors go around the school in a similar manner but dressed in humorous, thematic costumes. On this day, they also decorate their own classroom.

== See also ==
- Ballagás film by Tamás Almási
- Prom
- Education in Hungary
- Gaudeamus igitur
- School traditions of Selmec
- Stužková slávnosť the Slovak name of the Szalagavató
- Public Holidays in Hungary
- Matura
