= Borys Shchokin =

Ukrainian engineer (1945–2017)

Borys M. Shchokin
- Борис Михайлович Щёкин
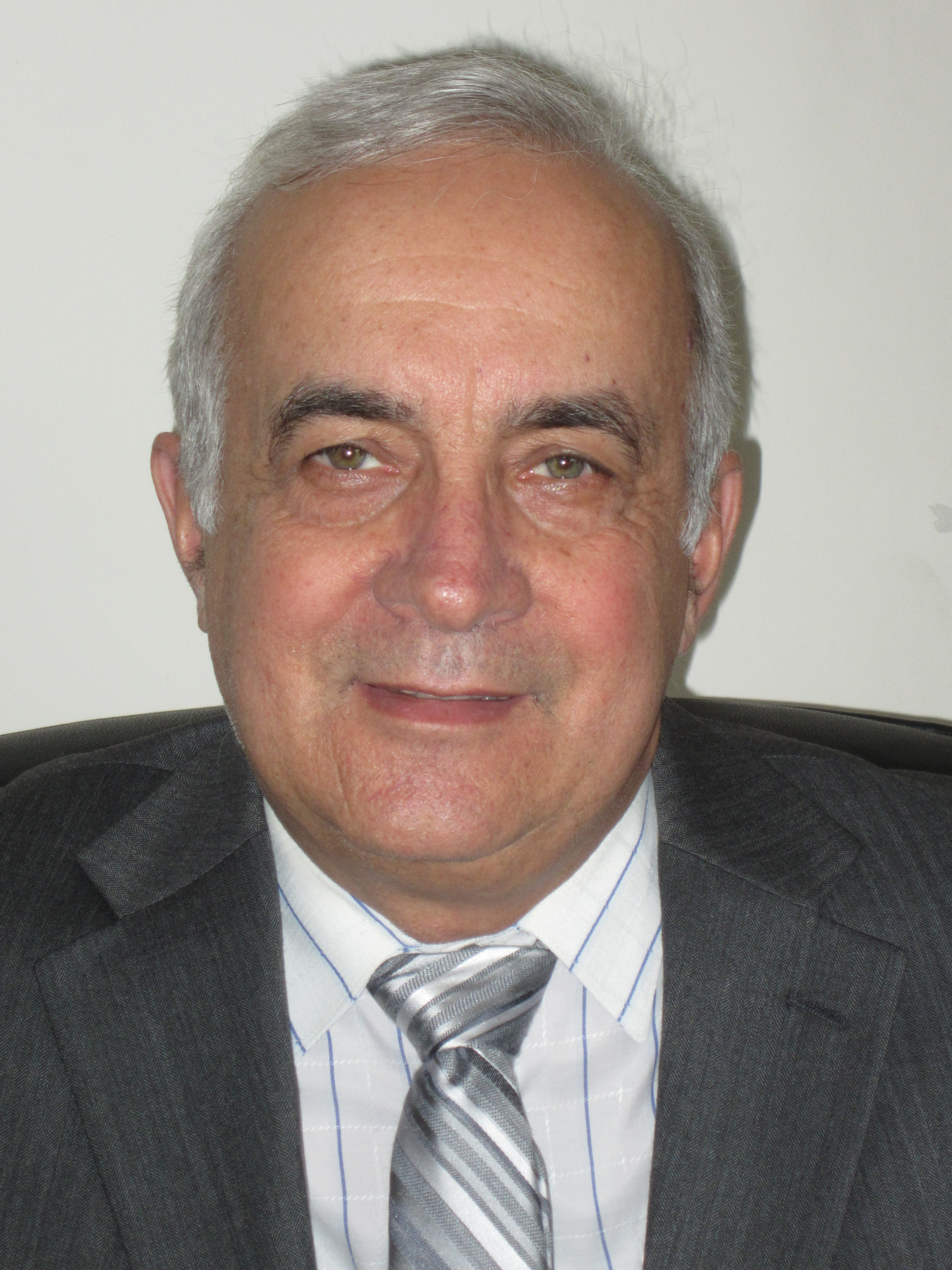
- Born: May 2, 1945; Belarusian SSR, Soviet Union
- Died: June 16, 2017 (aged 72); Ontario, Canada
- Education: Odessa National Polytechnic University
- Spouse: Lyudmyla Shchokina
- Children: Serge Shchokin; Oleg Shchekin
- Scientific career
- Institutions: Odessa National Polytechnic University; Ryerson University; Miskolc University

Borys Mikhailovych Shchokin (Russian: Борис Михайлович Щёкин; May 2, 1945 – June 16, 2017) was a Ukrainian scientist, researcher and teacher who worked in the field of Electromechanical systems and Engineering.

== Career ==
Shchokin received his primary and secondary education in Ukraine. He received his Engineering Diploma from Odessa Polytechnic Institute in 1967. From 1976 until 2001, Shchokin taught Theoretical Mechanics, Mechanics of Machines, Resistance of Materials, Applied Mechanics, Machine Design, Robotics and Automation and Mechatronics in Mechanical Engineering Department of Odessa National Polytechnic University, Ukraine (1979–2001), Faculty of Mechanical Engineering and Information Science of University of Miskolc, Hungary (1981–1990), Faculty of Engineering of University of Cienfuegos, Cuba (1987). In 1990, he became a professor of Mechanical Engineering Department in Odessa National Polytechnic University. In 1995 he became the member of IFToMM (International Federation for the Theory of Machines and Mechanisms) Technical Committee on Gearing. In 2001, Shchokin accepted a Research Associate position in Department of Mechanical and Industrial Engineering of Ryerson University in Toronto, Canada. Then from 2004 and until 2011, he was adjunct professor in Ryerson University, Faculty of Engineering, Architecture and Science on the basis of his work in parallel and distributed manipulators at Robotic and Manufacturing Automation Lab. In 2006, Shchokin was made an Honorary Professor of Miskolc University, Faculty of Engineering, Hungary.

== Books and papers ==
- The theory of machines and mechanisms
- Optimal synthesis of manipulator schemes for industrial robots
- Design and kinematic analysis of a rotary positioner

Borys Shchokin was also a member of the Scientific Committee for the book "Advances in Mechanisms Design".

== Patents ==
Shchokin owned more than 28 patents in the field of Mechanical Engineering.

- Closure panel counterbalance mechanism with friction device
- Electromechanical strut with motor-gearbox assembly having dual stage planetary gearbox
- Electromechanical strut with electromechanical brake and method of allowing and preventing movement of a closure member of a vehicle
- Magnetic Friction Clutch
- Electromechanical Strut

== Death ==
Shchokin died on June 16, 2017 (age 72) in Ontario, Canada.
