= Child protection =

Protecting children from harm and neglect

Child protection (also called child welfare) is the safeguarding of children from violence, exploitation, abuse, abandonment, and neglect. It involves identifying signs of potential harm. This includes responding to allegations or suspicions of abuse, providing support and services to protect children, and holding those who have harmed them accountable.

The primary goal of child protection is to ensure that all children are safe and free from harm or danger. Child protection also works to prevent future harm by creating policies and systems that identify and respond to risks before they lead to harm.

In order to achieve these goals, research suggests that child protection services should be provided in a holistic way. This means taking into account the social, economic, cultural, psychological, and environmental factors that can contribute to the risk of harm for individual children and their families. Collaboration across sectors and disciplines to create a comprehensive system of support and safety for children is required.

It is the responsibility of individuals, organizations, and governments to ensure that children are protected from harm and their rights are respected. This includes providing a safe environment for children to grow and develop, protecting them from physical, emotional and sexual abuse, and ensuring they have access to education, healthcare, and resources to fulfill their basic needs.

Child protection systems are a set of services, usually government-run, designed to protect children and young people who are underage and to encourage family stability. UNICEF defines a 'child protection system' as:

"The set of laws, policies, regulations and services needed across all social sectors – especially social welfare, education, health, security and justice – to support prevention and response to protection-related risks. These systems are part of social protection, and extend beyond it. At the level of prevention, their aim includes supporting and strengthening families to reduce social exclusion, and to lower the risk of separation, violence and exploitation. Responsibilities are often spread across government agencies, with services delivered by local authorities, non-State providers, and community groups, making coordination between sectors and levels, including routine referral systems etc.., a necessary component of effective child protection systems."

— United Nations Economic and Social Council (2008), UNICEF Child Protection Strategy, E/ICEF/2008/5/Rev.1, par. 12–13.

Under Article 19 of the UN Convention on the Rights of the Child, a 'child protection system' provides for the protection of children in and out of the home. One of the ways this can be enabled is through the provision of quality education, the fourth of the United Nations Sustainable Development Goals, in addition to other child protection systems. Some literature argues that child protection begins at conception; even how the conception took place can affect the child's development.

== Areas of focus ==
=== Child labor ===
Child labor is the practice of having children engage in economic activity on a part-time or full-time basis. The practice is harmful to their physical and mental development. It is considered to be a form of exploitation and is illegal in many countries.

Due to economic reasons, especially in poor countries, children are forced to work in order to survive. Child labor often happens in difficult conditions, which are dangerous and impairable to the education of future citizens, and increase vulnerability to adults. It is hard to know exactly the age and number of children who are affected. At least 152 million children under five years of age worked in 2016, but the figure is underestimated because domestic labor is not counted. The actual statistics cannot be counted exactly due to the many cases of child labor going unseen.

In an effort to prevent further exploitation commonly seen in the sphere of child labor, the US Department of Labor, under the Wage and Hour Division organization, has increasingly pushed for stronger policies that place limitations on how much and how often children ages 14–15 can work. Working in tandem with state and national governments, a number of NGOs have also contributed towards promoting policies that prevent the exploitation of children in the workplace. Other suggested strategies to combatting against the malpractices within child labor include extending already existing child security programs to incorporate other environmental factors such as contraction of diseases, socioeconomic status, and marginalization based on racial identity or immigration status.

=== Endangerment ===
Child endangerment is the act of placing a child in a situation that neglects their health or life. Child endangerment can cause many negative physical and mental effects. This can stem from abusive parental care, child neglect, and a multitude of other reasons.

Ways to prevent incidents of child endangerment include primary parents or caregivers spending ample time with their children and seeking out appropriate resources to assist in understanding early childhood development. A number of states in the US have laws put in place to prevent child abuse or neglect, with the majority of them focusing on arrest sentences up to five years and fines ranging from $5,000-$15,000.

=== Infanticide (child murder) ===
Infanticide is the intentional killing of infants and young children. This practice has been documented throughout history and still occurs in certain cultures today, usually as a result of poverty and/or other social pressures. Infanticide can be carried out by parents, relatives, or strangers and is often seen as a form of gender-based violence, since female babies are more likely to be killed than male ones. In some cases, infanticide may also be used to conceal evidence of incest or rape. It is most commonly practiced in cultures where there is a preference for male children, or where resources are scarce.

In some countries, children can be imprisoned for common crimes. In some countries, like Iran or China, criminals can even be sentenced to capital punishment for crimes committed while they were children (the United States abandoned the practice in 2005). In contexts where military use of children is made, they also risk becoming prisoners of war. Other children are forced into prostitution, exploited by adults for illegal traffic in children, or endangered by poverty and hunger. Infanticide today continues at a much higher rate in areas of extremely high poverty and overpopulation, such as parts of China and India. Female infants, then and even now, are particularly vulnerable, which is a factor in sex-selective female infanticide.

=== Child abuse ===
Many children who come to the attention of the child welfare system do so because of situations which are often referred to as child abuse. Abuse typically involves abuse of power, or exercising power for an unintended purpose. This includes willful neglect, knowingly not exercising a power for the purpose for which it was intended. This is why child abuse is defined as taking advantage of a position of trust having been invested with powers.

- Physical abuse is physical assault or battery on the child. Whilst an assault has some adverse consequence that the victim did not agree to (the difference between surgery and stabbing) the victim agrees to the consequences of battery but the agreement is fraudulent in some way (e.g. unnecessary surgery under false pretenses). Physical abuse is also harassment, a physical presence intended to provoke fear.
- Child sexual abuse is sexual assault or battery on the child. The vast majority of physical assaults are a reaction to a situation involving a specific victim. Sexual assault is predominantly perpetrator gratification against any suitable target. Sexual abuse covers the range of direct and indirect assaults (e.g. imagery) and the means of facilitation such as stalking and internet offenses.
- Child neglect is defined as failure to take adequate measures to safeguard a child from harm, and gross negligence in providing for a child's basic needs. Needs are the actions to be taken to protect and provide for the child. Safeguarding is the duty of a person given the powers of responsibility for the child to take the necessary measures to protect the child. If a child is physically or sexually abused, then there is an (abusive) person responsible for the assault and a (negligent) person responsible for failing to protect them from the assault. In some cases, they may be the same.
- Psychological abuse is when meeting the child's needs by taking the necessary steps to protect and provide for the child the child's wishes and feelings must be considered when deciding on delivery of the provision that best serves the child's needs. Willfully failing to provide in accordance with the child's wishes and feelings whilst it is in the child's best interests is emotional abuse (intentional infliction of emotional distress) or negligently is emotional neglect (negligent infliction of emotional distress).

=== Parental responsibility ===
Parental responsibility is the legal obligation of a parent to provide for their child's physical, emotional, and financial needs. This includes providing food, shelter, clothing, education, medical care, and emotional support. It also includes protecting the child from harm and ensuring their safety. In 1984 the Council of Europe, the body that supervises the European Convention on Human Rights, made Recommendation R(84) 4 on Parental Responsibilities. These defined parental responsibility as a 'function' duties to be met and powers that can be exercised to meet those duties. Child abuse and neglect is failure by a person with parental or any other protective responsibility to exercise the powers for the intended purpose, which is the benefit of the child.

Actions typically include services aimed at supporting at-risk families so they can remain intact to safeguard and promote the welfare of the child, investigation of alleged child abuse and, if necessary, assuming parental responsibility by foster care and adoption services.

=== Child maltreatment ===
Child maltreatment refers to any type of harsh treatment or abuse which results in harm to a child. Examples of child maltreatment include physical abuse, sexual abuse, emotional abuse, exploitation, deprivation and neglect. The long-term impact of abuse on victims often includes physical injury, psychological and behavioral harm, and can potentially be carried across generations.

Caregiver maltreatment of children is a global problem that can occur in adoption programs, regardless of social status and in cases of discrimination and early or unwanted pregnancy. Adopted children may be mistreated more than biological children. Additionally, children may suffer maltreatment due to their social status, and discrimination based on skin color has also been documented as a factor in child maltreatment. Unwanted pregnancies can also increase tension in the household, potentially leading to the mistreatment of a child. Child maltreatment can even occur in cases where state or other guardians take responsibility for a child's welfare.

Various services exist to address or prevent child maltreatment; these services can be provided by businesses or by government agencies. Where these services encounter cases of maltreatment, the state then creates a supportive family environment for the abused child. This entails the regulation of both public and private entities providing care for children and families.

Australian legislation refers to "reportable conduct", and to "reportable conduct schemes" which ensure that actions are reported to the appropriate authorities and that people who make such reports in good faith are subsequently protected. In the case of New South Wales, the nature of reportable conduct is defined in the state's Children's Guardian Act 2019 and the Child Protection (Working with Children) Act 2012.

=== Other ===
A 2014 European Commission survey on child protection systems listed the following categories of children needing help:

- Child victims of bullying or cyber-bullying
- Child victims of female genital mutilation or forced marriage
- Child victims of neglect or abuse
- Child victims of sexual abuse/exploitation
- Child victims of trafficking
- Children affected by custody disputes, including parental child abduction
- Children belonging to minority ethnic groups, e.g. Roma
- Children left behind (by parents who move to another EU country for work)
- Children in a situation of migration
- Children in judicial proceedings
- Children in or at risk of poverty
- Children in police custody or detention
- Children of parents in prison or custody
- Children with disabilities
- Children without parental care/in alternative care
- Children who are not in compulsory education or training or working children below the legal age for work
- Missing children (e.g. runaways, abducted children, unaccompanied children going missing)
- Unaccompanied children in a situation of migration

== International treaties ==
The International Labor Organization (ILO) is a United Nations agency dealing with labor issues, created in 1919. It takes care also of child labor issues, in particular with conventions 138 and 182.

On 20 November 1959 the United Nations General Assembly adopted a Declaration of the Rights of the Child during the Convention on the Rights of the Child.

The United Nations Children's Fund (UNICEF) is a United Nations Program headquartered in New York City, that provides long-term humanitarian and developmental assistance to children and mothers in developing countries.

In 2000, an agreement was reached among United Nations member states about the military use of children.

The effectiveness of these programs is contested and seems limited to some.

== Challenges ==
Child protection systems, particularly in Africa and other less developed regions, face significant structural and systemic challenges that prevent effective implementation. These include poverty, disease, conflict, weak institutional capacity, external influences, cultural norms, and emerging threats.

=== Poverty and Economic Constraints ===
Poverty is a major barrier to child protection, affecting both prevention programs and response mechanisms. Financial instability limits access to education, healthcare, and basic needs, often forcing kids into exploitative situations such as child labor, street life, and early marriage. In extreme cases, children engage in "survival sex" for food or money. The lack of income-generating opportunities for families exacerbates vulnerabilities, making systemic child protection efforts difficult to sustain in low-resource settings.

=== HIV/AIDS and Its Impact ===
The HIV/AIDS pandemic has also severely disrupted child protection structures, creating a generation of orphans and vulnerable children. In countries like Zimbabwe, for example, the epidemic has reversed gains in education and healthcare, overwhelming social welfare systems. Traditional community support mechanisms struggle to meet the needs of affected children, leading to increased risks of institutionalization, child labor, and early marriage.

=== War and Armed Conflict ===
Children in conflict zones face extreme risks, including violence, displacement, and psychological trauma. Modern warfare often targets civilian infrastructure, leaving children without family support, education, or healthcare. An estimated 10–20% of war-affected children develop psychiatric conditions such as post-traumatic stress disorder (PTSD) without intervention. Family disintegration and revenge fantasies among traumatized youth further complicate long-term recovery.

=== Weak Systems and Resource Shortages ===
Many countries lack the financial and human resources needed for functional child protection services. Legal frameworks may exist, but implementation is impaired by underfunded social services, leading to reliance on NGOs and charities. A "crisis discourse" often prioritizes emergency interventions over preventive measures, leaving systemic weaknesses ignored.

=== Dominance of External Child Protection Models ===
Child protection frameworks in much of the Global South are influenced by Western models, which emphasize statutory interventions and individual case management over community-based approaches. This "exported discourse" can marginalize indigenous practices and reinforce colonial legacies, sometimes creating mismatches between policy and local realities.

=== Cultural and Social Norms ===
Traditional attitudes sometimes perpetuate harm, such as treating domestic violence as a private matter or stigmatizing abuse victims. Some cultural practices, including forced marriages for pregnant girls, undermine legal protections.

=== Emerging Threats ===
New challenges, such as climate-induced disasters, digital exploitation, and the COVID-19 pandemic, have intensified risks for children. School closures during the pandemic led to spikes in child marriage and gender-based violence, while economic collapse pushed more children into street situations. Online abuse and trafficking have also risen with increased internet access.

These intersecting challenges create a complex environment where child protection systems struggle to function effectively, often leaving vulnerable children without adequate safeguards.

== History ==
Provincial or state governments' child protection legislation empowers the government department or agency to provide services in the area and to intervene in families where child abuse or other problems are suspected. The agency that manages these services has various names in different provinces and states, e.g., Department of Children's Services, Children's Aid, Department of Child and Family Services. There is some consistency in the nature of laws, though the application of the laws varies across the country.

The United Nations has addressed child abuse as a human rights issue, adding a section specifically to children in the Universal Declaration of Human Rights:

Recognizing that the child, for the full and harmonious development of his or her personality, should grow up in a family environment, in an atmosphere of happiness, love and understanding should be afforded the right to survival; to develop to the fullest; to protection from harmful influences, abuse and exploitation; and to participate fully in family, cultural and social life.

== Child protection assessment ==
A key part of child protection work is assessment.

A particular challenge arises where child protection professionals are assessing families where neglect is occurring. Professionals conducting assessments of families where neglect is taking place are said to sometimes make the following errors:

- Failure to ask the right types of question, including
  - Whether neglect is occurring?
  - Why neglect is occurring?
  - What the situation is like for the child?
  - Whether improvement in the family are likely to be sustained?
  - What needs to be done to ensure the long-term safety of the child?

== See also ==
=== Prominent child protection organizations ===
- Defense for Children International
- ECPAT International
- Free the Children
- Friends-International
- Mannerheim League for Child Welfare
- Odisha State Child Protection Society
- Save the Children
- UNICEF
- War Child
- WE Charity
- World Vision

=== Topics ===
- Aboriginal child protection
- Adoption and Safe Families Act
- Child abandonment
- Child abuse
- Child harvesting
- Child marriage
- Child Protection and Obscenity Enforcement Act
- Child Protective Services
- Child sexual abuse
- Complex post traumatic stress disorder
- For the children (politics)
- Hague Convention on Parental Responsibility and Protection of Children
- Independent Safeguarding Authority
- Landeros v. Flood
- Minimum Standards for Child Protection in Humanitarian Action
- Parental controls
- Policing for Children
- Protection of Children from Sexual Offences Act
- Reactive attachment disorder
- School social work in Hungary
- Transnational child protection

=== Policies ===
- Child and family services
- Social policy
- Health policy
- Education policy
- Social care
