= Stužková slávnosť =

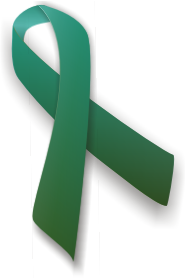
A green ribbon, which is pinned on student's suit

A stužková slávnosť (Slovak pronunciation: [ˈstuʂkɔʋaː ˈslaːvnɔsc]), commonly named a stužková and verbatim in English: Green ribbon ceremony or Ribbon ceremony, is a Slovak and Hungarian secondary school ceremonial event, which takes place before the matura. The Hungarian version of the ceremony is the Szalagavató ([ˈsɒlɒɡɒvɒtoː]), held in a style similar to its Slovak counterpart. During this event the "baptized" green ribbons are pinned on the formal vested students by the class teacher or professor in the presence of the "godmother" or "godfather" (a special teacher, who is chosen to "baptize" the ribbons) and the principal. The green ribbon is meant to be a hope to help students pass the matura.

Do not mistake the stužková with prom, which is in United States or United Kingdom. Prom is about the individual, on occasion it can be about the couple. Parents may take some photos before prom, send their children off for the night, wait up for their son or daughter to come home, might ask how things went. Beyond that, there is not much room for parents to be involved. It can be argued that for some attendees prom is a coming-of-age ceremony.

But on the other hand, stužková slávnosť is about others. Stužková slávnosť is about thanking teachers and parents and a few close friends. It is an expensive and elaborate formal party put on for those people. It is weeks and months of preparation and hours of entertainment meant to please the students' guests. Much time and effort is put into the evening's events by the class.

== History ==
Tradition of the stužková slávnosť is related to the establishment of the gymnasiums and secondary professional schools in the former Czechoslovakia after First World War. Students of the German and the Hungarian gymnasiums had to pin their ribbons on their coats before Czechoslovakia. According to the ethnographer Viera Feglová, the beginnings of stužková slávnosť in Slovakia came from Mining-Forestry School in Banská Štiavnica (then called Selmecbánya).

== In popular culture ==
In 1985 became the theme for the eponymous song from the album Hodina slovenčiny by Slovak pop rock band Elán.

== See also ==
- Gaudeamus igitur
- Szalagavató
- Matura
- Chastushka
- Education in Slovakia and Education in Hungary
