= University Town (Miskolc) =

Egyetemváros University Town
- Neighbourhood
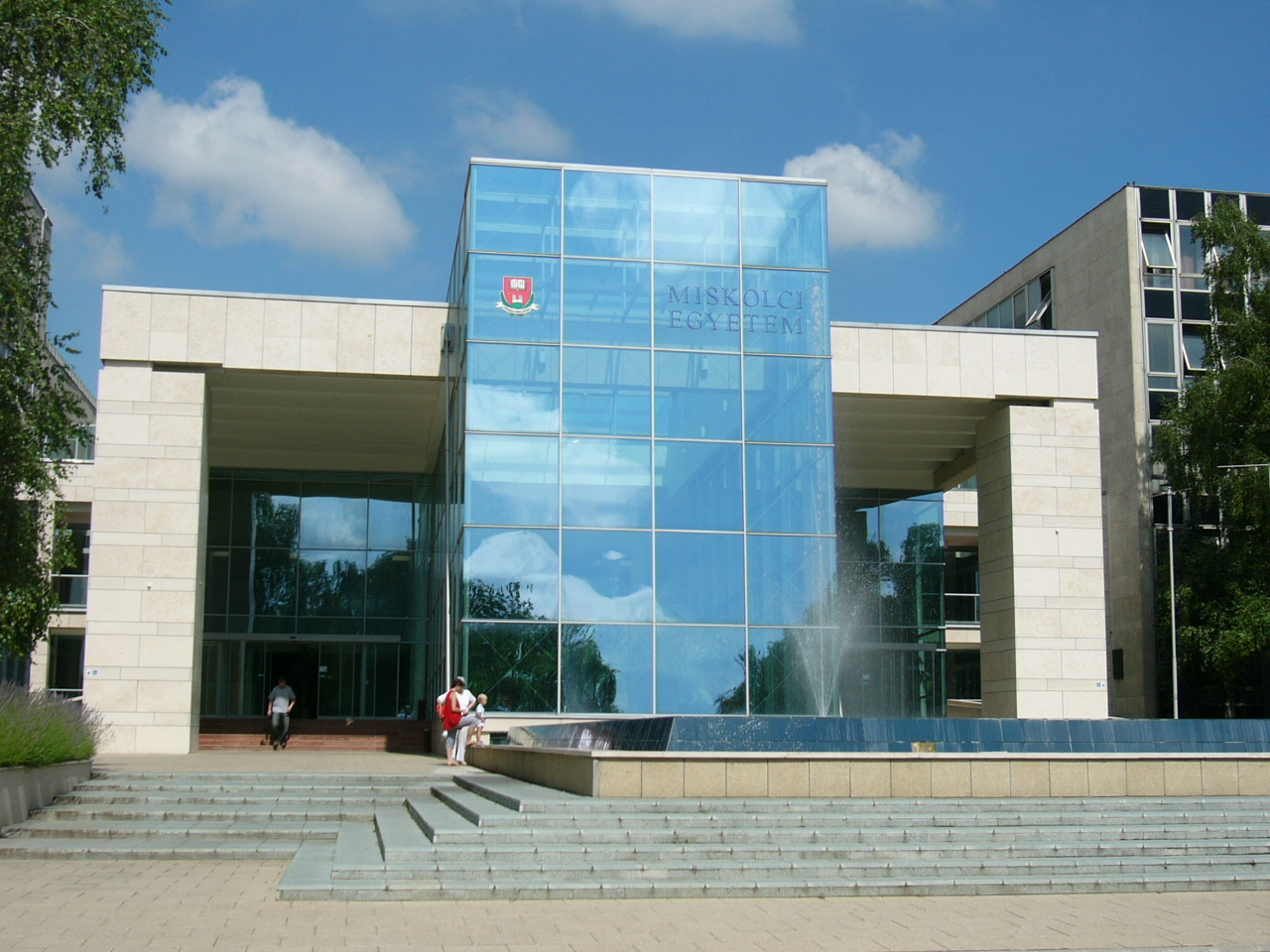
- Entrance to the university's main building

- Location within Hungary
- Country: Hungary
- Regions: Northern Hungary
- County: Borsod-Abaúj-Zemplén County
- District: Miskolc District

Area
  - Total: 0.85 km^{2} (0.33 sq mi)
- Time zone: UTC+1 (CET)
  - Summer (DST): UTC+2 (CEST)
- Postal code: 3515
- Area code: +36 (46)

Egyetemváros (literally: University Town), is a neighbourhood of the city of Miskolc, in Borsod-Abaúj-Zemplén County, Hungary where the buildings of the University of Miskolc stand. Its area is approximately 850.000 m^{2} and can be found between the Avas hill and Miskolctapolca.

In the center of the park surrounding this part of the city are the university’s administrative and major academic buildings, the university dormitories, the Central Library, the Continuing Education Center, the University Sports Hall, the Dénes Kemény Municipal Swimming Pool, the Institute of Applied Chemistry, and the cafeteria building. The area also features sports fields and tennis courts. The renovated Miskolc Athletics Center was opened in 2015.

== History ==
Following the Treaty of Trianon, in 1920, Selmecbánya (now Banská Štiavnica) became part of Czechoslovakia, so the Mining and Metallurgy Academy, founded in 1735, was forced to relocate. The school first moved to Sopron.

During the socialist era, the National Assembly decreed that a University of Heavy Industry (Nehézipari Műszaki Egyetem) should be established in Miskolc. The new institution was founded consisting of the Faculty of Mining and Metallurgical Engineering, which had been relocated from Sopron and the newly established Faculty of Mechanical Engineering.

The first day of classes was on September 18, 1949. Classes did not yet begin within the university’s current walls, as the site of today’s university was not designated until February 1950.

Prisoners were also conscripted to work on the construction of the University Town; among the political prisoners was pianist György Cziffra. The first academic buildings in the University Town were put into use in the autumn of 1951.

== Gallery ==
The building of the Borsod-Abaúj-Zemplén County Archives in the University Town

Dénes Kemény Swimming Pool

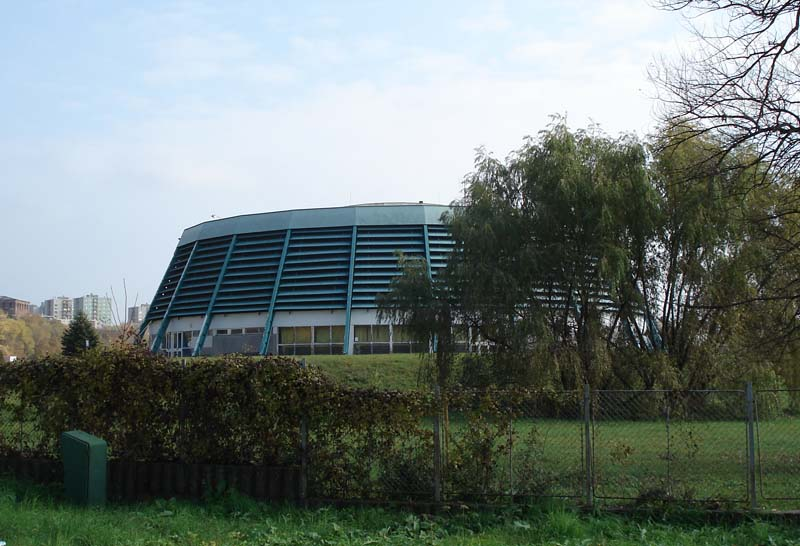
University Sports Hall

University Central Library

A4 building

== See also ==
- University of Miskolc
- School traditions of Selmec
