= Turquoise ribbon =

Symbol

Turquoise Ribbon

The turquoise ribbon is a symbol for promoting

- Native American reparations
- Addiction Recovery
- Deaf Communities around the world.
- Bone Tumor Awareness (musculoskeletal tumors & lesions, benign/malignant)
- Congenital Diaphragmatic Hernia (CDH)
- Dysautonomia
- Interstitial Cystitis
- Lymphedema
- Renal Cell Carcinoma
- Tourette syndrome
