= Friends-International =

- Founded: 1994
- Founder: Sebastien Marot; Mark Turgesen; Barbara Adams
- Type: Non-governmental organization Social Enterprise
- Purpose: The empowerment and social reintegration of marginalized urban children/youth
- Location: House 89B, Street 103, Phnom Penh, Cambodia
- Region served: Worldwide; Southeast Asia
- Method: Holistic social services model implemented through a comprehensive case management system
- Key people: Sebastien Marot (Executive Director)
- Revenue: US$6.55 million (2013)
- Employees: 536 (March 2014)
- Website: friends-international.org

Friends-International (FI) is an international social enterprise and registered non-governmental organization focusing on children's empowerment established in Cambodia in 1994. Its mission is "to build a future where all children are safe from all forms of abuse, are able to become productive citizens of their countries and contribute to a more equitable and sustainable world." FI works in Cambodia, Indonesia, Laos, Thailand and Myanmar, and with almost 50 partners around the world, providing social services to marginalized urban young people and their families.

FI runs a variety of projects that fall into three programs: Friends Alliance, ChildSafe Movement, and 3PC.

== Friends Alliance Programs ==
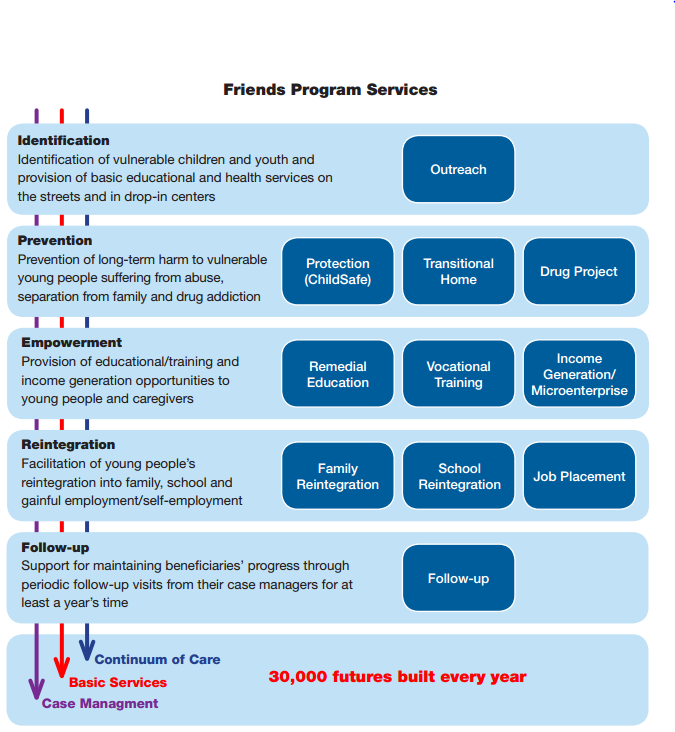
A diagram explaining the progression of a beneficiary through FI's program services to the end goal of sustained reintegration

Friends-International runs social services programs supporting the development of children, youth, their families and communities that impacts over 127,000 beneficiaries a year in Cambodia, Thailand, Laos, Myanmar and Indonesia. Friends programs are defined by a range of services that respond to the many challenges that marginalized young people face, namely abuse, sickness, drug use, exclusion from educational and training opportunities, child labor, poverty and separation from family. Their programs consist of a continuum of care in which beneficiaries build gradually to the result of reintegration. Program services are facilitated through a comprehensive case management system (individualized support to each beneficiary by an assigned case manager) and ongoing access to basic services (health checkups, non-formal education, awareness building, counseling).

=== Outreach ===
Outreach activities are carried out on the streets, in communities and in drop-in centers. Strong trust-based relationships are built with the children and their families over time, their needs assessed and alternatives to street life presented. The Outreach team, made up of trained social workers and medical staff, provides healthcare, medical services, hygiene facilities/materials, non-formal education (mobile schools and libraries to build children's affinity for school), life skills education and awareness raising (in reproductive health, drugs, hygiene, nutrition, street safety, early childhood care, child rights, safe migration), recreational activities (sports, games) and finally, referrals to other FI projects. In 2013, Outreach served 18,000 marginalized children, youth and caregivers.

=== Public school reintegration ===
FI's School Reintegration Project (initiated in 1996) aims to provide a path for out-of-school children to reintegrate into the public school system. Children who are able and willing to re-enter school are first enrolled in FI's remedial education project, where they are brought up to speed in literacy, mathematics, science, geography and history. At the start of the public school year, FI supports him/her to reintegrate into a local school and provides the necessities needed for class. After reintegration is achieved FI provides ongoing support for the child to stay in school through continuous follow-ups, support classes and by encouraging parents to become active participants in their child's education. In 2013, the project supported the reintegration of 4,000 children and provided remedial education to 400 children.

=== Vocational training and job placement ===
The Vocational Training Project (initiated in 1995) provides access to professional skills training in order to foster the future employment opportunities of marginalized youth. Depending on the country program, the project offers training in a range of different professions including: barbering/hairdressing, welding, hospitality/ cooking, electronic appliance repair, electronic circuitry, motor mechanics, sewing and beauty/manicure. The program also entails a full range of basic and social services, such as psycho-social counseling, literacy/numeracy education, life skills education and job readiness education. After graduation, FI social workers work together with graduates to help them find employment or start their own micro-enterprises. Periodic follows-up are organized for a minimum of one year to ensure sustained reintegration. In 2013, FI provided 900 youth with vocational training and placed 300 youth in employment/self-employment.

=== Transitional home ===
Transitional Homes are temporary shelters for marginalized children separated from their caregivers or in emergency situations. The purpose of the Transitional Home is to facilitate the transition from a state of emergency to a state of recovery and reintegration. Those who stay at the Transitional Homes are provided with a stabilizing environment consisting of hygiene facilities, medical treatment, daily meals and counseling from FI's social workers. Social workers work to reintegrate the resident into a family environment and, if applicable, offer them a place in FI's remedial education and vocational training projects. In 2013, 1,000 children and youth were provided shelter at the Transitional Homes.

=== Drug project ===
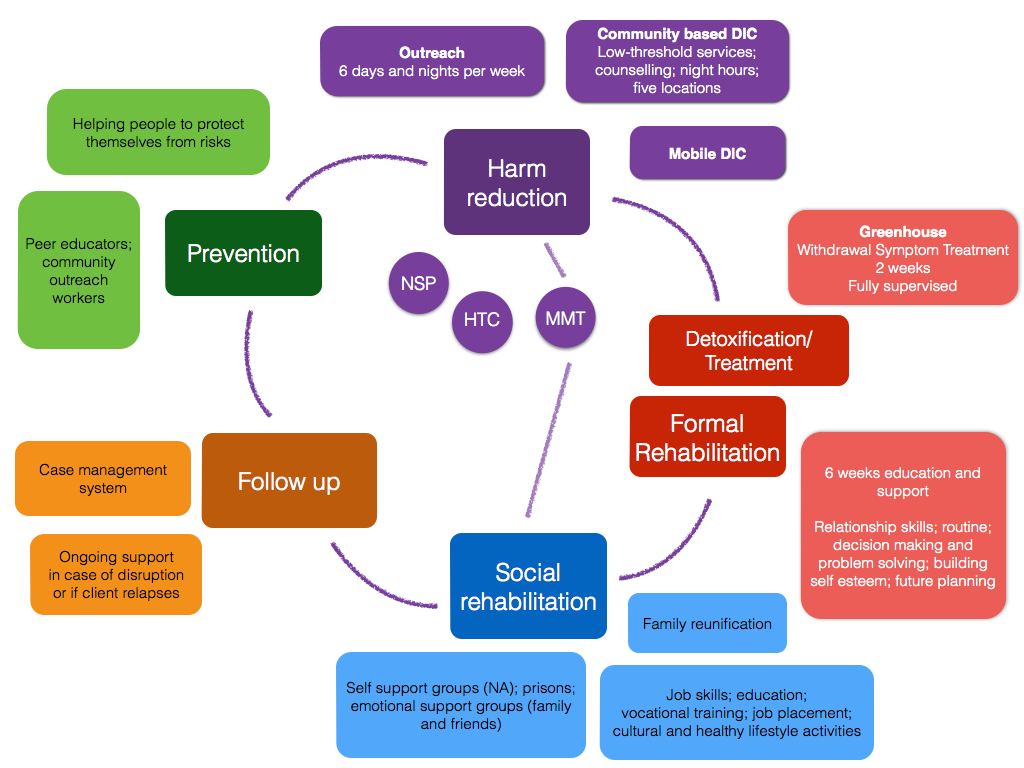
Flow chart description of the Drug Project's continuum of care

FI's Drug Project (initiated in 1998) is one of the only holistic approaches for drug using youth in Cambodia. It provides a set of prevention and harm reduction services to drug using street children and youth as well as services to help them recover from addictions and return to normal life through rehabilitation with family/school reintegration, and training and job placement. The Drug Project was the first established in Cambodia to respond to the growing need for drug programs specifically targeting street youth. Currently FI is one of only three organizations in Cambodia licensed by the government to implement needle and syringe exchange programs. In 2013, 150 children/youth went through voluntary detoxification and 100,000 clean syringes were provided to drug users to prevent the spread of infectious diseases.

=== Income generation projects ===
FI operates two projects supporting stable income generation: Micro-enterprise (initiated in 2005) and Home Based Production (HBP; initiated in 2003). The first is offered to vocational training graduates as well as marginalized caregivers who are motivated to start their own businesses. FI helps them realize their ambitions by providing business management and skills training, business planning support, and equipment and materials until the enterprise is self-sustainable. Under the latter, HBP, FI provides training to vulnerable caregivers (HIV positive mothers, mothers with young children) in the production of Friends Social Business products to be sold at Friends'n Stuff outlet stores. These projects bring various benefits such as ensuring children can attend school, facilitating family stability and improved childcare, and stimulating local economies. Follow-ups and continuous support are provided to ensure sustainability. In 2013, 450 caregivers received income generation support, benefiting over 1,200 children.

=== Family reintegration project ===
The Family Reintegration Project is based on the principle that the family is the best environment for a child's development. FI's beneficiaries may be either temporarily separated due to abuse, migration or family dysfunctionality, or may be orphans who were abandoned or whose caregivers died. While children access temporary lodging in FI's Transitional Home and receive psycho-social support, FI's social workers conduct family tracing, assess the beneficiary's family environment, and work with dysfunctional and abusive families in order to re-establish family connections and realize reintegration. When direct family reintegration is not safe or possible, FI identifies suitable alternative care options, such as foster care, so that the child is able to grow up as a part of a family. Follows-ups are carried out to ensure the beneficiary's well-being after reintegration. In 2013, 400 children/youth were reintegrated into family environments.

== ChildSafe Movement ==
ChildSafe poster from the international Children are not Tourist Attractions Campaign in 2011

ChildSafe (initiated in 2005) is the arm of FI that works to protect and preserve the rights of children, employing a mix of advocacy, training and community capacity building. Through its wide reaching campaign activities ChildSafe spreads awareness of the risks that marginalized children face and promotes the best practices embodied in the ChildSafe Tips. Its international campaigns, such as the "Think Before You Give to Begging Children" Campaign, reach millions of people every year around the world and its local campaigns, such as the Citizens and Community campaigns, spread awareness in cities around Southeast Asia. ChildSafe also provides direct assistance to children in emergencies through its ChildSafe Network initiative. Through the Network, ChildSafe identifies and trains key members of local communities to be able to recognize and effectively assist children in distress. These activities are complemented by the ChildSafe Hotline, a call service run by trained FI social workers who receive reports of children in distress and take action to protect them 24 hours a day/7 days a week. Below is a summary of ChildSafe activities in 2015:

- ChildSafe Campaigns
  - 6,317,669 people exposed to ChildSafe campaigns and 7 Traveler Tips globally
  - 2,847,772 persons exposed to national Citizen Tips
- ChildSafe Movement and Hotline
  - 7.738 total trained and certified Movement members
  - ChildSafe is operational in 18 countries: Cambodia, Thailand,

Indonesia, Lao PDR, The Philippines, Vietnam, Japan, France, Germany, Switzerland, US, Myanmar, Singapore, Honduras, Egypt, Kenya, UK, China

  - 8,997 children/youth are protected due to the Hotline and ChildSafe members' actions

== Social businesses ==
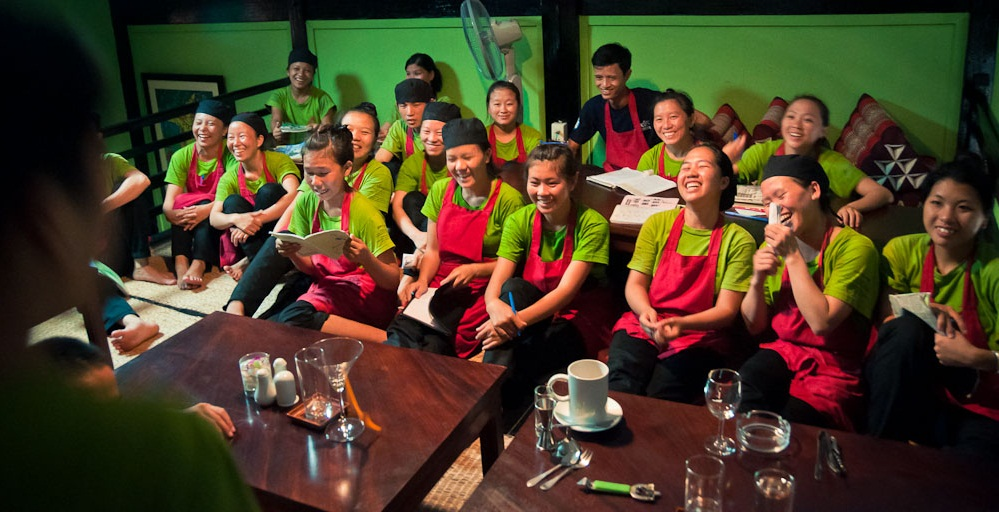
A gathering of vocational training students at FI's training restaurant, Makphet, in Vientiane, Lao PDR

In order to ensure that its social services achieve a high level of financial sustainability, FI integrates several of its activities into a social business framework. In connection with its Home Based Production Project, Friends Social Business (FSB; initiated in 2001) provides a market and a source of income for marginalized caregivers' products through the Friends'n Stuff outlets. FSB also complements the Vocational Training Project, giving students crucial real life experience in customer service and business management. Most notable among its VT shops are the TREE Alliance training restaurants, which have received acclaim from restaurant goers internationally. FI's TREE Alliance franchise exists to standardize and spread best practices in the field of training restaurants. Through these initiatives, the organization reached 8% self-sustainability in 2013. Below is a summary of current FSB activities as of March 2014:

- TREE Alliance Restaurants
  - 8 training restaurants in 4 countries (Cambodia, Laos, Thailand and Ethiopia), training 230 youth
- Friends'n Stuff Outlets
  - 7 outlets in 3 countries (Cambodia, Laos and Thailand), providing stable income to 180 vulnerable caregivers
- Vocational Training Social Businesses
  - VT shops in 2 countries (Cambodia, Laos), providing training to 520 youth
