= School social work in Hungary =

School social work in Hungary aims to provide services to children and their families to ensure that they have the opportunity to complete their education. Aid is particularly focused on impoverished areas with higher proportions of at-risk children and youth.

== History ==
The first steps toward school social work in Hungary were taken after World War I, when school nurses (referred to as green cross nurses by Emőke Bányai) started working at schools in the late 1930s. Similar to that of a present-day social worker, they pursued individual case work and aided families in the field and at school. The nurses had a college or university degree in education and belonged to the staff of the school, with the scope of their duties shaped according to its needs. The nurses offered family care services mainly for families residing in the slums of Budapest in order to prevent academic failure and school dropout.

Following World War II, the Hungarian political elite declared that education was the primary requirement for child protection. The first significant change in child protection took place in 1964, when teachers were appointed child protection workers in the kindergartens and schools of Budapest. Elements similar to those in the work of school social workers appeared in the scope of activities of family care workers employed by educational advisory services, which were launched in 1967. In 1975, child protection supervisors were appointed to advise child protection workers at schools. Such child protection supervision functioned until 1985.

Employees of family-care centres established in the mid-1980s developed a committed social worker identity. They made regular contacts with local schools, kindergartens, and offered various services to the children, parents and teachers. As a form of youth protection, a so-called afternoon-care system was functioning in the 1970s and 1980s with elements resembling present-day social work.

Social and economic changes taking place in the late 1980s and the consequent increase in the rate of unemployment, declassing and dramatic impoverishment of certain social groups, changes in social norms and values, and the related emergence and extension of deviant behaviour challenged schools. It became apparent that these sudden and intensely rising problems were preventing schools from fulfilling their basic tasks, and could not be addressed by traditional educational tools. Child protection workers, whose positions were filled by teachers, did not have the qualifications or the time necessary for the management of complicated cases. Finally, schools stated their claim to employ professionals who provide personal social services for pupils, parents and staff members.

== Resolutions of the 1990s ==
To resolve the problems which had arisen, three basic concepts were developed by the early 1990s: the appointment of dedicated full- and part-time child protection workers, specialized schools for underprivileged areas with large numbers of at-risk children, and teams of social workers based in local child care centres.

=== Appointing teachers to the duty of child protection ===
==== Employment of child protection workers ====
The management of some schools sought to enhanced child protection service by partially or wholly freeing the workdays of teachers willing and suited to the task of assisting troubled children and their families. Teachers so appointed usually did not have proper qualifications nor were they sufficiently equipped (with an interview room, telephone and supervision). As they were expected to act according to the interests of the school which employed them, it was difficult for them to advocate for the children and their families against the school administration. Colleagues often overwhelmed them with feelings of frustration and unreasonable demands, and they were frequently called to serve as substitute teachers on their days off.

==== Employment of independent child protection workers ====
To improve upon the above model, child protection workers were separated from schools in the early 1990s and employed by the Educational Service Cabinet, in districts XV and XVI of Budapest. Their assignment and supervision was made by the educational department of the local government. This ended the conflict of loyalties but it continued to use educational means and an educational approach. The model was criticized as it continued to employ people who were teachers by training, rather than social workers; and as a government employee the school social worker could not stand against the state schools administration.

Despite these problems, the employment of child protection workers remained standard practice at schools.

=== Internal school social work ===
Alternative schools established in the early 1990s sought to provide education satisfying the individual needs of children coming from underprivileged social backgrounds and being unable to manage in a traditional school. In these schools, educational and social work overlap; the educational concept requires the staff to utilize social expertise in educational work. Success of the model is presumably due to the staff's awareness in handling problems that pupils face outside school and a supporting attitude toward pupils. Despite facing some of the same issues of conflict of interest, such schools continue to employ school social workers even when traditional schools ceased to offer services. Both the need among the pupils and the academic mission of the alternative schools legitimized the role of the school social worker.

=== External school social work ===
Recognizing the important role that schools played in child and youth protection work, the first school social work teams in Hungary were formed in the early 1990s (Gedeon 1996). Social services provided by external experts were introduced in several schools at the same time. On the basis of such work launched in autumn 1991 from a local child care centre to a school in District VII of Budapest, a team was set up with the help of the local government in 1992. In District VIII, it was also a child care centre that posted a school social worker to a local school. In 1993, the Child Protection Group initiated services in District XI. At the outset, the group belonged to the Educational Service Centre, and later was converted into a child welfare centre (Bányai 2009, Molnár 2009, Mihály 1991). These were distinguished from the independent child protection workers under the educational department of the local government.

Perhaps the best-known experimental project carrying out "external" school social work was the "Ferencváros" Network of School Social Workers. The network was started in summer 1992. Later it was renamed "Ferencváros" White Raven Child Welfare Service. In District IX of Budapest, the local government promoted the establishment of the child welfare service in 1992. The concept was developed by Dr Mihaly and her colleagues. The main principle on which they stood was: "Child protection must be removed from schools, but it must not be handed over to the system of authorities. A child protection system independent form authorities has to be created" (Dr Mihaly, 2008). It is a characteristic of the model that it considers the community surrounding the school, including the network of supporting organizations. They aspired to create and run a region-based child protection system. The social worker did not want to take up the child protection worker's duties, but focused on the role of a mediator, co-ordinator, and "catalyst". Working with pupils was reduced, since social workers were on duty at schools only once a week. The range of activities covered group work, organizing club sessions, summer camping and playrooms, and offering homework help – instead of doing case management for individuals. Furthermore, they worked with families and were entitled to offer them financial and in-kind assistance. A structure of services different from that of the traditional school social work evolved due to the lack of modern child protection services and institutions providing customized care for clients in Hungary. In particular, services were offered to families to prevent children from being removed from their birth parents, as there was no basic child welfare services separate from the operation of authorities. "Ferencváros" Child Welfare Service attempted to fill this gap.

This work led to the Child Welfare Act that came into effect in November 1997. After the law came into effect, the "Ferencváros" Child Welfare Service underwent a transformation: child welfare activities began to outweigh school social work, which had previously been of primary importance. The Child Welfare Act created new conditions for the operation of the other networks of school social workers and child welfare services as well, easing the burden on local governments. As a consequence, classical school social work became overshadowed by the corrective tasks of child welfare. As since 1996, Annex 1 of Act LXII of 1996 have been obliging schools to employ a part-time child protection worker, schools should have increased capability of support for students. However, in practice schools continued to give this work to teachers without adequate qualifications.

== Post-2000 ==
Since 2004, school social work has been expanding, with increasing employment. Child welfare services also focus more on school social work. Since the national register of school social workers is currently being prepared, exact data is unavailable.

At present, there are three main approaches to school social work in Hungary:

1. Internal school social work or the so-called traditional model
2. External school social work or the Ferencváros model
3. The Pécs model

Employing teachers as child protection workers is no longer a viable option following the introduction of university degree programmes in social work and social education, which provided qualified professionals.

=== Traditional model ===
In the internal or traditional model, the school social worker's employer is the administrator of the school. The school social worker offers various social services while present at the school, and is familiar with its functioning. The social worker may form a team with a school doctor or nurse, but generally does not have supervision or team case management available. This model is applied mainly by schools maintained by NGOs (e.g.: Burattino Általános - és Szakképző Iskola, Forrás Szakiskola, Gandhi Gimnázium, Világ Világossága Alapítvány), but a few such state schools also exist (e.g.: Radnóti Szakközépiskola in the city of Pécs, Éltes Mátyás Iskola, Magyarmecskei Általános Iskola). The first school social work programmes in Hungary followed this model.

=== External model ===
In the external or Ferencváros model, school social work is delivered to the by external suppliers through networks. Each colleague assists 4–5 schools (or kindergartens), with weekly service available for a relatively short time to each school. Group and community work overshadows individual case management. Qualified professionals are aided by supervision and team case management. External school social work is implemented mainly by state-run child welfare services (e.g.: II. kerületi Gyermekjóléti Központ, Újbudai Humán Szolgáltató Központ Gyermekjóléti Szolgálata, Sopron, Szombathely, Nyíregyháza), but there are some NGO-run services as well (e.g. Periféria Egyesület).

Programmes based on the external model were set back by the Child Protection Act, since the act promoted the corrective child protection activities of the services. However, new emphasis was placed on school social work after the 2003 consensus conference of child welfare services, which found only 14 percent of services carried out school social work in 2005. Strengths of the model are the employment of professionals with adequate qualifications and the support of networks. Critics of the model blame the departure from the conceptional framework of the traditional model (Bányai 2006), and the so-called "schedule of attendance", which means that a school social worker spends only a few hours a week at a particular school.

=== The Pécs model ===
The Pécs model, which was formed in 2006, combines the advantages of the previous two models. The school social worker assists one school per day with social services and attends weekly team case management meetings. A network of professionals offers support in supervision and individual counselling, case management, standardized paperwork and registration of clients, etc. The school social worker is employed by an NGO independent from both the school and the child welfare system, and is thus less biased by organizational hierarchy.

Conceptually, the framework uses modern ecological models applied to child-oriented school social work. The school social worker applies a preventive approach to find solutions to pupils' problems, using individual casework, social group work and community work, considering both the environment and the complexity of the personality, and seeks solutions with the help of a multidisciplinary team (Máté 2008). This model is applied by the Network of School Social Workers of INDIT Közalapítvány at six schools. The model co-operates closely with youth supporting programs outside schools. Moreover, INDIT Közalapítván itself runs youth-supporting programmes such as Youth Office "Alternative" (the first youth-supporting programme in Hungary located in a shopping mall), Street Social Work Service and the Party Service (a harm reduction programme for party-goers). Integration of the above programmes into one organization makes it possible for INDIT to reach school-dropouts and truants.

== Education and professional associations ==
Standardized training and active associations are of crucial importance to forming a cohesive profession. It is standard practice for school social workers in Hungary to have a university or college degree in social work or social education. These two professions, rooted in different cultures [social work from the United States and social education from Germany], have developed quite similarly and are nearly identical in scope.

There are some regional variances depending on the type of degree programmes available in the area. At Bárczi Gusztáv Gyógypedagógiai Főiskola, psychoeducators for specialized child protection work have been trained since 1973. From 1985 several degree programmes for general child protection have been accredited. ELTE (Eötvös Loránd University of Budapest) launched a postgraduate degree programme in social policy in 1985. Hungarian colleges and universities started undergraduate programmes in general social work in 1989 and in social education in 1990. Requirements of qualification of undergraduate programmes in social studies (social policy, social work, social education) were issued in 1996 (Government Decree on Requirements of Qualification of Undergraduate University Degree Programmes in Social Studies 6/1996 [18 January], Annex 2) (Bucsy 2005). Courses on school social work were introduced to the above programmes. Dr. István Budai at Vitéz János Tanítóképző Főiskola (Vitéz János Teacher Training College) in 1991 and Emőke Bányai at ELTE in 1993 were the first to teach this subject. According to the results of a study carried out in 2009, school social work is currently taught at eleven university departments of social work and at six departments of social education. School social work is part of undergraduate degree programmes at most faculties training social professionals, which demonstrates the importance of the subject. However, there have yet to be any graduate-level programs in Hungary, though Kodolányi János University of Applied Sciences plans to launch a one-year master programme in school social work. The first Hungarian school social work textbook was published in 1993 by the Vitéz János Tanítóképző Főiskola (Vitéz János Teacher Training College of Esztergom) and the Óvóképző Főiskola (Preschool Teacher Training College of Hajdúböszörmény) and was edited by István Budai. The book was published under the title Papers on child welfare I. – School social work.

The Hungarian School Social Worker Association was founded at a conference organized by Kodolányi János University of Applied Sciences on 30 November 2007, in Székesfehérvár. Objectives of the association are:

- to knit Hungarian school social professionals together
- to serve as a scientific and professional basis for school social workers and as an organization representing their interests
- to improve the life quality of children and youth living in Hungary by means of spreading school social work across the country.

The association intends to participate in the codification of regulations controlling school social work. As part of the above policy formulation and law making process, the association is ready to contribute to defining the conditions and protocol for school social work and to the improvement of finances.

== See also ==
- Education in Hungary
