= School traditions of Selmec =

School traditions of Selmec originate from the Kingdom of Hungary, Selmecbánya (today Slovakia, Banská Štiavnica) and they are closely associated with the students of the Academy of Selmec. The traditions exist since 1735, when the institution was founded and named Bergschola. The school had students from all over Europe and the Habsburg Empire. When education started, the newcomers did not have an opportunity of having an accommodation or medical treatment, therefore they were supported by the older students. The newcomers underwent several challenges and an ’exam’ to be in favour of the older students. The traditions helped to create a solidarity and a communion between them. The traditions can be traced back to the system of guilds in the 12th and 14th century. Nowadays, the spirit of the Selmec traditions are kept alive by students studying in Hungarian universities, particularly in Miskolc, Sopron, Dunaújváros and Székesfehérvár and Szombathely.

The main components of the tradition are the various uniforms, profession evenings, songs and the Salamander, which is a ritual performed by graduating students.

== Uniforms ==
The ancestor of all uniforms were the miners’ uniform. The function of it was to protect the miners at work. However, the uniforms are now different according to the several professions and faculties:

=== Gruben ===
Uniform of the miners and the metal workers. It is black with a velvet.

=== Auf or aufhauer ===
Uniform of the metal workers, mechanics, organisers and teachers of technical subjects. It is coloured black or blue with a colorful velvet.

=== Walden ===
Worn by the foresters, woodcutters and geodesists. It is fawn-coloured with a green, black or blue velvet.

There are other uniforms, which appeared first in the year 2000 at the University of Miskolc. These are:

Juratus for the jurists, students of the law faculty

Individual economist costume for the economists, students of the economics faculty

Bocskai and Kazinczy individual costumes(in Hungarian: egyenviseletek) for arts faculty students

Stefania for the medical faculty students

The uniforms can have patches (for Bocskai and Kazinczy on the inside, for others on the outside) or accessories such as a long stem called ’fokos’ (Hungarian). Today, these function only as ornaments.

== Profession evenings and songs ==
Originally, a profession evening, (in Hungarian: szakestély) was organised to discuss the features of professional issues. Nowadays, these issues gave way to civilised fun. There are still several remarks made by students on these evenings about professional issues, but these were made in a rather funnier way. Only the ’baptised’ and invited students can participate in these special evenings. The students usually sing songs together during the event and there are so-called office-holders with names of Latin-German origin. Some of them are wearing a ribbon and they are holding particular duties during the evening.

== Salamander ==
It is the farewell ceremony practiced since 1830 by the university graduates who have kept the spirit of the school traditions. In the course of it, the graduating students participate in a process which traditionally takes place in the city centre; holding torches and lamps while singing songs that are originated from Selmec.
