= University of Miskolc =

University in Miskolc, Hungary

Coordinates: 48°04′47″N 20°45′54″E

- Miskolci Egyetem
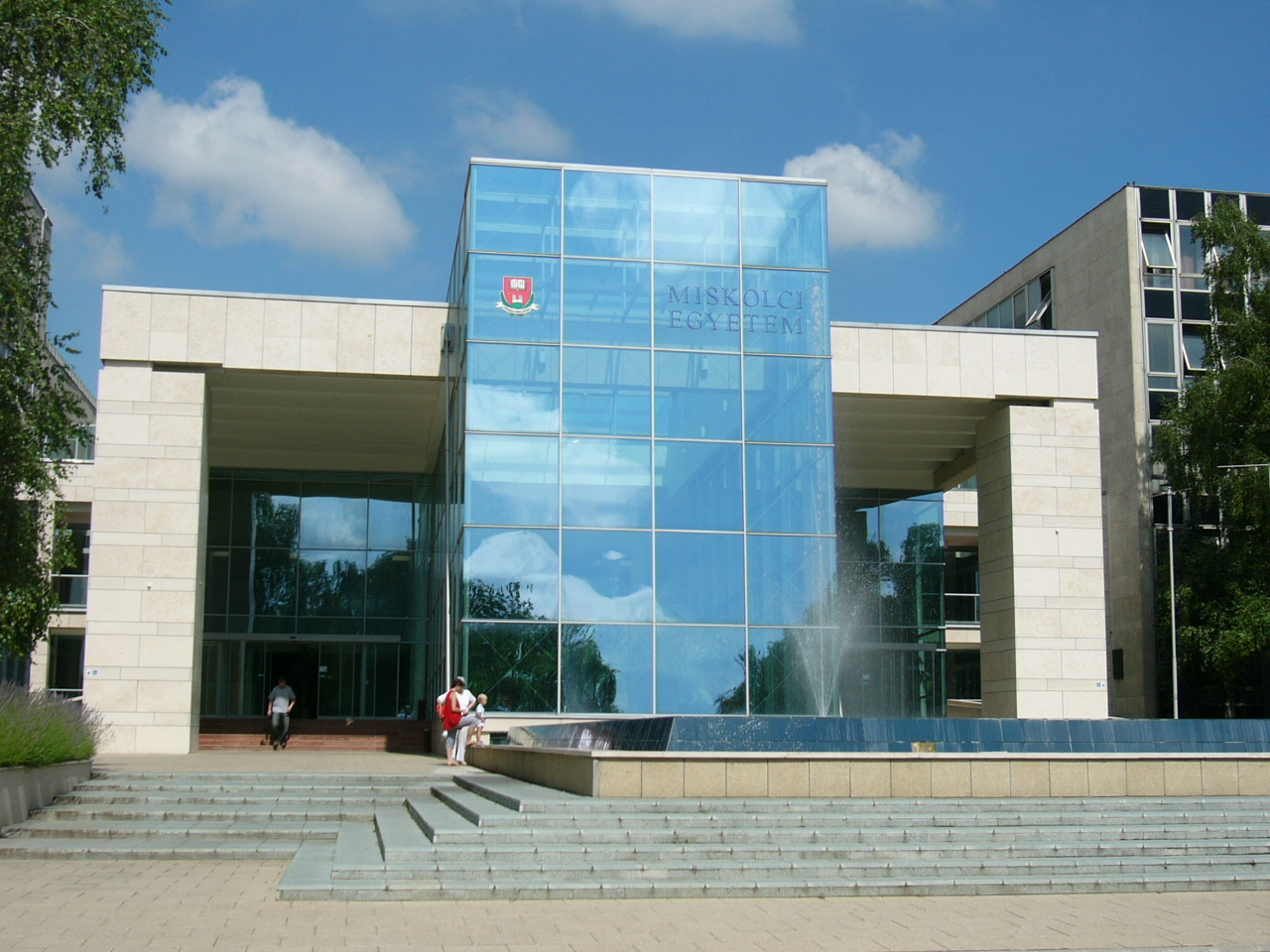
- The main entrance of the university
- Type: Public University
- Established: 1735 (1949)
- Affiliations: EUA
- Rector: Prof. Dr. Zita Horváth
- Students: 15,000
- Location: Miskolc, Hungary
- Website: www.uni-miskolc.hu

University rankings

Regional – Overall
- QS Emerging Europe and Central Asia: 140 (2022)

The University of Miskolc (before 1990: Technical University of Heavy Industry) is the largest university of Northern Hungary.

== Location ==
Most of the buildings can be found in Egyetemváros ("University Town"), a part of the city of Miskolc. Its area is about 850,000 square metres. The Béla Bartók Music Institute, which became a faculty of the university in 1997, can be found in the downtown, in the so-called Palace of Music. The Comenius Teacher's Faculty, previously Comenius Teacher's College, which became a faculty of the university in 2000, can be found in Sárospatak.

== History ==
The university was established by act of parliament in 1949. The university is the successor of the University of Mining and Metallurgy of Selmecbánya (established in 1735)—thus adopting its school traditions as well—which was one of the first schools under non-ecclesiastical control in the Habsburg Empire. After the Ausgleich the name of the Selmecbánya university was changed to Royal Hungarian Academy of Mining and Forestry.

When Hungary lost its northern territories to Czechoslovakia after the Treaty of Trianon, the academy was moved from Selmecbánya (now Banská Štiavnica, Slovakia) to Sopron.

During the socialist era of Hungary the northern parts of the country were developed into an important industrial zone. According to this the government decided to have a university founded in Miskolc, the largest city of the area. The construction began in 1950. The University of Miskolc bore the name of Communist dictator Mátyás Rákosi at that time. In 1952 the metallurgy faculty moved from Sopron to Miskolc, and the mining faculty was divided between the two cities until 1957, when this faculty moved to Miskolc too. The faculties that stayed in Sopron formed the University of Forestry, which later became a part of today's University of West Hungary.

From 1969 to 2000 the Metallurgy College of Dunaújváros belonged to the university.

During the 1980s the university, where formerly only subjects concerning heavy industry were taught, began to change its profile. A faculty of law was formed in 1981, followed by a faculty of economy in 1987. Accordingly, the name of the university was changed from Technical University of Heavy Industry to University of Miskolc. The arts faculty was formed in 1992, and the Music Institute (founded in 1904) joined the university in 1997.

The Comenius Teacher's College, which joined the university in 2000, has a rich history too: it was founded in 1531 as one of the first Protestant colleges of the country, and the famous Czech teacher Comenius taught here in the 17th century.

Currently the University of Miskolc has more than 100 faculties, about 850 teachers and more than 15,000 students.

== Faculties ==
- Faculty of Earth Science and Engineering (1735)
- Faculty of Materials and Metallurgical Engineering (1735)
- Faculty of Mechanical Engineering and Information Science (1949)
- Faculty of Law (1980)
- Faculty of Economics (1987)
- Faculty of Arts (1992)
- Bartók Béla Institute of Music (1904/1997)
- Comenius Training College Academical (1531/2001)
- Faculty of Healthcare(1985/2005)

== Notable alumni ==
- Anikó Raisz
