= Education in Hungary =

Ministry of Human Resources
- Minister State Secretary for Education: Miklós Kásler; Zoltán Maruzsa

General details
- Primary languages: Hungarian
- System type: Central

Literacy (2003)
- Total: 99.4
- Male: 99.5
- Female: 99.3

Enrollment
- Total: 1,877,500
- Primary: 886,500
- Secondary: 570,000
- Post secondary: 421,000

Attainment
- Secondary diploma: 86
- Post-secondary diploma: 14

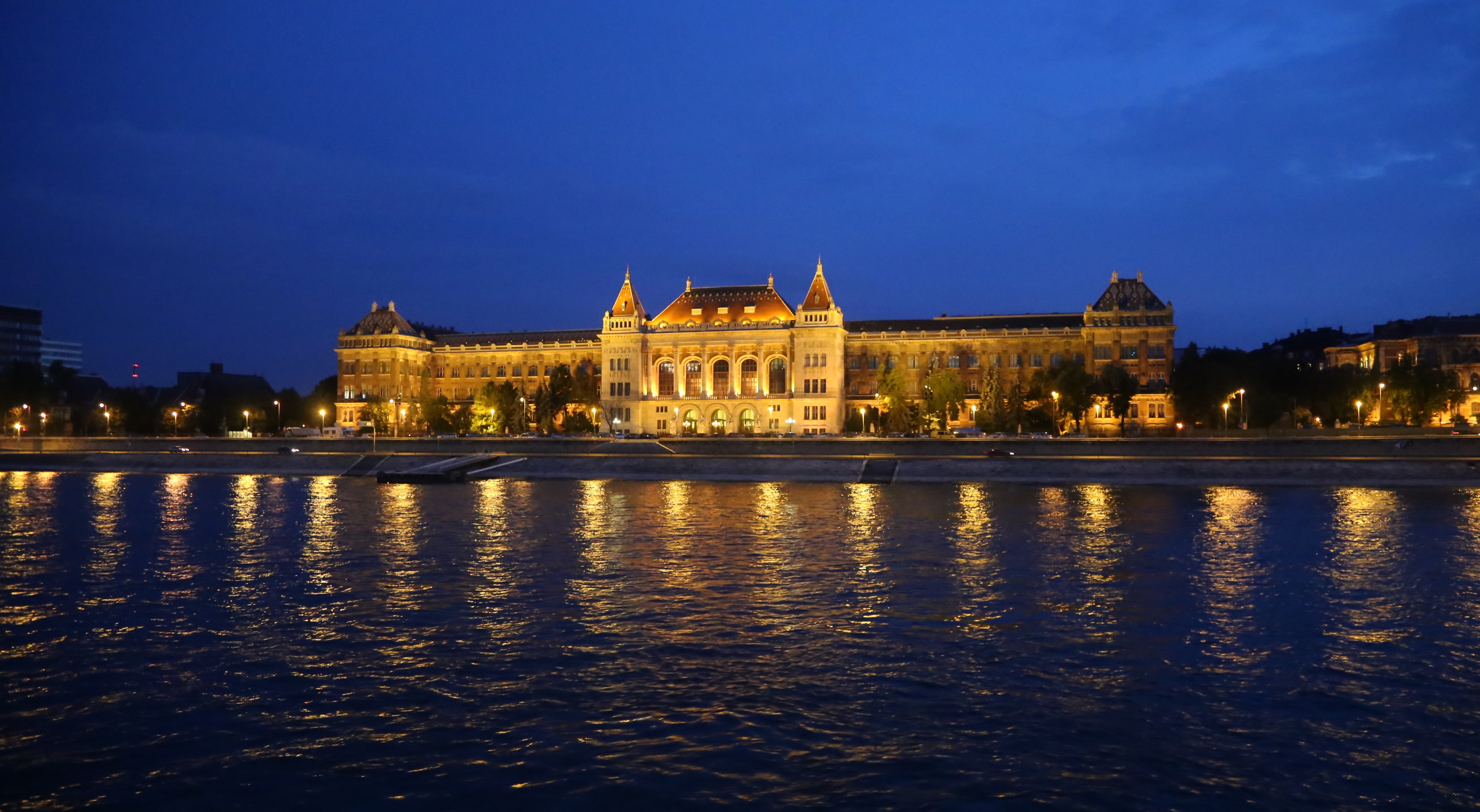
Budapest University of Technology and Economics, it is the oldest Institute of technology in the world, founded in 1782

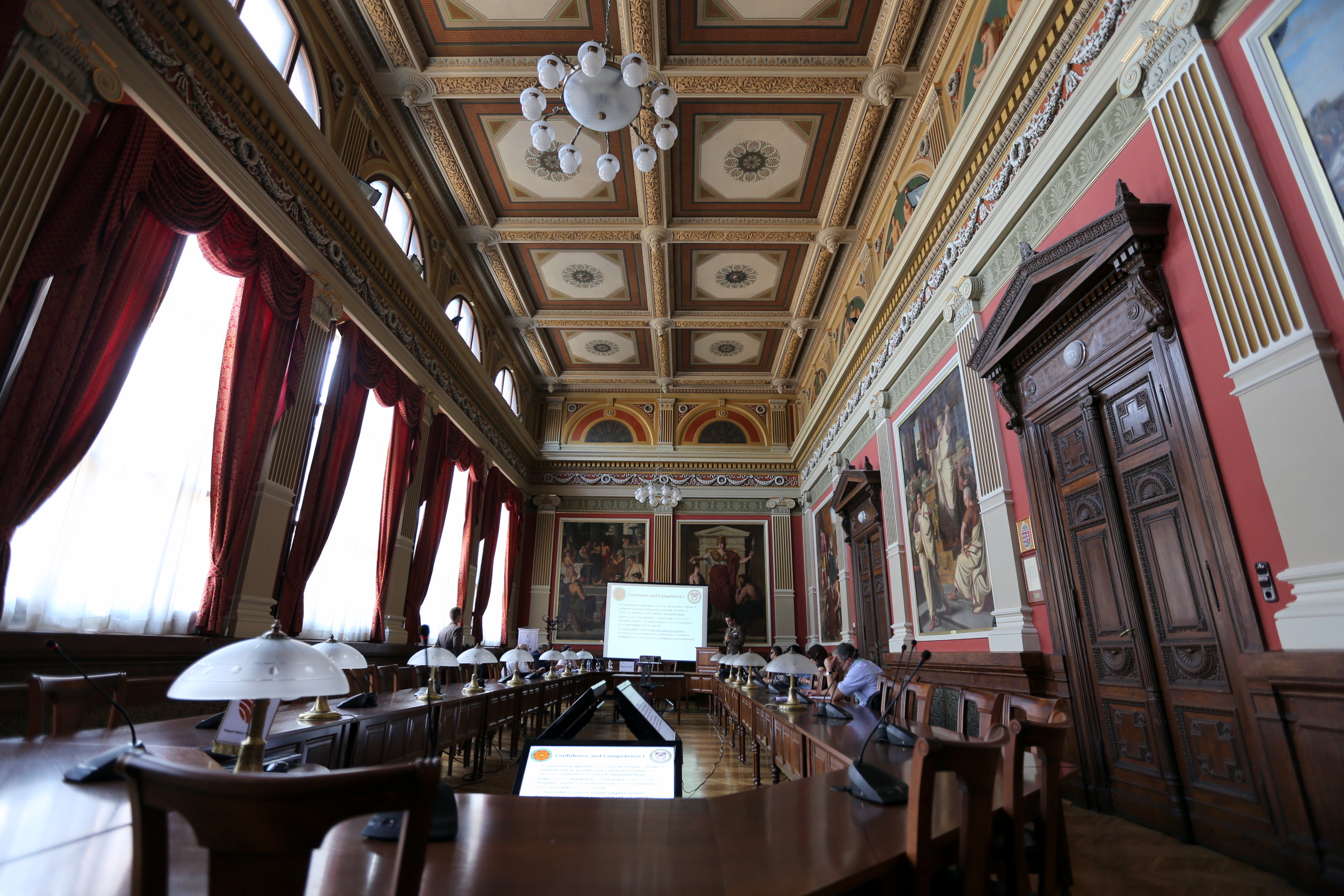
Rector's Council Hall of Budapest Business School, the first public business school in the world, founded in 1857

The educational system in Hungary is predominantly public, run by the Ministry of Human Resources. Preschool kindergarten education is compulsory and provided for all children between three and six years old, after which school attendance is also compulsory until age of sixteen. Primary education usually lasts for eight years. Secondary education includes three traditional types of schools focused on different academic levels: the Gymnasium enrols the most gifted children and prepares students for university studies; the secondary vocational schools for intermediate students lasts four years and the technical school prepares pupils for vocational education and the world of work. The system is partly flexible and bridges exist, graduates from a vocational school can achieve a two years program to have access to vocational higher education for instance. The Trends in International Mathematics and Science Study (TIMSS) rated 13–14-year-old pupils in Hungary among the best in the world for maths and science.

Most Hungarian universities are public institutions, and students traditionally study without fee payment. The general requirement for university is the Matura. The Hungarian public higher education system includes universities and other higher education institutes, that provide both education curricula and related degrees up to doctoral degree and also contribute to research activities. Health insurance for students is free until the end of their studies. English and German language is important in Hungarian higher education, there are a number of degree programs that are taught in these languages, which attracts thousands of exchange students every year. Hungary's higher education and training has been ranked 44 out of 148 countries in the Global competitiveness Report 2014.

Today there are 67 higher education institutions in Hungary, ranging from small colleges to top research universities. These universities and colleges are maintained either by the state, private organizations or a church. In accordance with the objectives of the Bologna process the degree structure of tertiary education is based on three cycles. Nearly all study fields lead first to a Bachelor's degree (usually 3 years), and after a further study period to a Master's degree (2 years). However, there are some exceptions: medicine, pharmacy, dental and veterinary studies, architecture, law, teacher training, and certain arts-, crafts- and design-related study programmes, which retain a long single-cycle structure of 5 or 6 years of study. The first-cycle programmes last 6–8 semesters (3–4 years, 180–240 credit points) and lead to a bachelor's degree (in Hungarian: alapfokozat). The second cycle, leading to a master's degree (in Hungarian: mesterfokozat), lasts 2–4 semesters (1–2 years, 60–120 credit points). Two-year-long vocational higher education programmes (in Hungarian: felsőoktatási szakképzés) are also available on an optional basis prior to first-cycle programmes and lead to advanced vocational qualifications. The 120 credit points gained in vocational higher education programmes are compatible for recognition in the first (Bachelor) cycle. Any Bachelor's or master's degree can be followed by specialised higher education courses (in Hungarian: szakirányú továbbképzés). These do not lead to another degree but offer the option of specialisation in a particular field of study. Courses can be studied full-time, part-time or through distance learning. A four-year doctoral programme is a post-graduate course to follow any Master's or equivalent qualification.

Hungary has a long tradition of higher education reflecting the existence of established knowledge economy. The established universities in Hungary include some of the oldest in the world, the first was the University of Pécs founded in 1367 which is still functioning, although in the year 1276, the university of Veszprém was destroyed by the troops of Peter Csák, but it was never rebuilt. Sigismund established Óbuda University in 1395. Another, Universitas Istropolitana, was established 1465 in Pozsony by Mattias Corvinus. Nagyszombat University was founded in 1635 and moved to Buda in 1777 and it is called Eötvös Loránd University today. The world's first institute of technology was founded in Selmecbánya, Kingdom of Hungary in 1735, its legal successor is the University of Miskolc. The Budapest University of Technology and Economics is considered the oldest institute of technology in the world with university rank and structure, its legal predecessor the Institutum Geometrico-Hydrotechnicum was founded in 1782 by Emperor Joseph II.

== The social environment of education ==
The decline of Hungary's population that started in 1981 has also continued in recent years. According to the 2001 census, the population of Hungary was 10,198,000, about half a million less than the figure of twenty years earlier. By 2005 the population dropped to 10,077,000. The age pyramid of the Hungarian population is among the most irregular ones in Europe. On 1 January 2005, due to the extremely low number of live births in the preceding years the size of the 0-4-year-old population was smaller than the next age groups of five-year increments up to the age group 60–64. There are major differences in the size of the various generations.

The official language of instruction is Hungarian, but a number of ethnic and national minorities (e.g. German, Romanian, Slovene, Serb and Croatian) have minority educational institutions with their own languages as first or second language of instruction at primary and secondary level of teaching. According to the 2003 survey, the rate of Romani children in the population entering school education in 2008–2009 is expected to be around 15%.

== School system in Hungary ==
A special feature of the Hungarian education system is that institutional structures and the structure of educational programmes are not aligned with each other. The system's institutional structure and the presence of programmes allowing early selection show similarities with Central European and ex-socialist countries. The system's content structure, the uniform and general phase of education has extended, and secondary level education may be characterised by increased opportunities for transition. The general phase of education lasts until the age of 18 in Hungary's education system. Participation in secondary education, offering a wide variety of programmes, is fairly high. Within secondary education, the proportion of students studying in programmes leading to a secondary school-leaving certificate and offering transition to tertiary education is around the international average.

=== Hungarian education and training programmes (ISCED-97) ===
Institutional setting of programme	Programme destination and orientation	Notes
Pre-school	0	School-based programme for children aged 3–7. Includes basic skills development, pre-reading, drawing, singing, and school preparation.
General school	1AG	General school primary level, Grades 1–4.
	2AG	General school lower secondary level, Grades 5–8.
Vocational training school (Apprenticeship training)	2BG	Remedial programme for drop-outs and low achievers that provides a second chance for further education
	2CV	Vocational training school programmes preparing qualifications for trades identified in the National Register of Vocational Qualifications that do not require the completion of 10 years of general education for entry
	3CG	Vocational training school, Grades 9–10. General subject courses with vocational guidance preparing students for entering into programmes that require 10 years of general education
	3CV	3-year apprenticeship training programmes according to the Education Act of 1985 starting after grade 8 of the general school. 1997/98 was the last year of new enrollments, because the new law does not allow dualsystem vocational education before age 16.
	4CV	Post-secondary vocational programmes where the entry requirement is the completion of secondary education
Special vocational training school	2CP	Basic skills and labour market oriented development programme for students with special educational needs
General secondary school	2AG	Grades 5–8, and 7–8 of the eight-grade and six-grade general secondary school
	3AG	General secondary education, grades 9–12 preparing students for secondary school final examination
Vocational secondary school	3AP	Vocational secondary school programmes preparing students for secondary school final examination with pre-vocational elements, Grades 9–12 (13).
	3BP	Vocational secondary part-time programmes, Grades 9–12 (13) preparing for secondary school final examination with pre-vocational programme elements
	4AG	General secondary programme preparing for secondary school final examination for vocational training school graduates (3CV)
	4CV	Post-secondary vocational programmes where the entry requirement is a secondary school-leaving certificate
	5B	Non-university higher vocational training programmes leading to non-graduate vocational qualifications with credit courses acknowledged in higher education
College, university	5A	College graduate education and post-graduate specialisation programmes, university graduate education, university supplementary (Master) programme for college graduates, Supplementary teacher training programme for engineers graduated incollege education, university post-graduate specialisation programme for university graduates
University	6	PhD courses, research work and dissertation DLA, doctoral degree in liberal arts

Source: Statistical Yearbook of Education 2002/2003, OM, 2003.
Notes: Destination for which the programmes have been designed to prepare students: A=access to further general education, B=access to further vocational education, C=access to the labour market. Orientation category is based on the degree to which content of programme has been specifically designed: G=general, P=pre-vocational, V=vocational.

=== Pre-primary education ===
This educational level is considered as a crucially important integrated part of the school system. It caters for children from 3 to 7 years of age. Since 2015, participation in pre-primary education at this level (kindergarten) is compulsory from age 3 (before 2015 only the final year – beyond age 5 – was compulsory), although exceptions are made for developmental reasons

Public-sector institutions may only charge for services additional to their basic tasks, including for example extracurricular activities, meals, excursions, etc. Currently, the attendance rate with regard to the age groups 3–5, is just above 86%. The average duration of participation of children aged 3–7 in pre-primary education is just over 3 years (3.3), which is the highest average value in Europe.

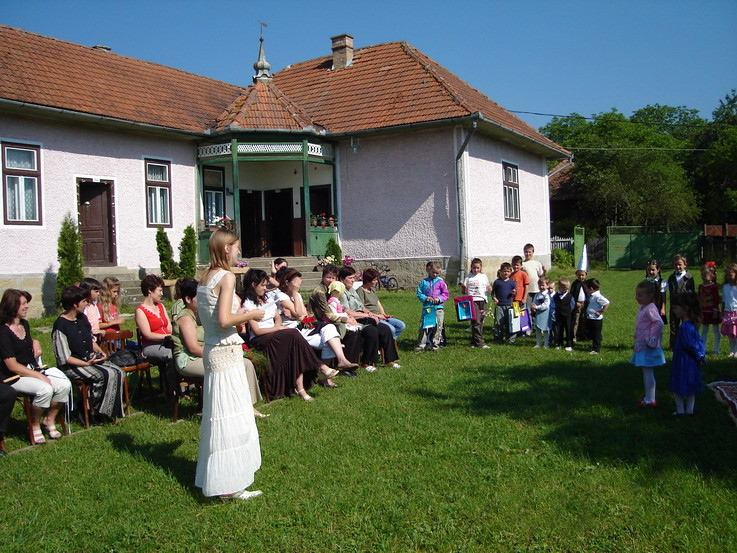
A Hungarian pre-school class having outdoor activities, March 2007.

In Hungary a kindergarten is called an óvoda ('place for caring'). Children attend kindergarten between the ages of 3–6/7 (they go to school in the year in which they have their 7th birthday). Attendance in kindergarten is compulsory from the age of 3 years, though exceptions are made for developmental reasons. Though kindergartens may include programs in subjects such as foreign languages and music, children spend most of their time playing. In their last year children begin to be prepared to attend elementary school.

Most kindergartens are state-funded. Kindergarten teachers are required to have a diploma.

=== Primary education ===
Children start primary school when they reach school-maturity, usually in the year in which they have their 6th birthday (7th if they were born after August 31).

Primary education can last for 4, 6 or 8 years. 8-year education is the most widespread; the other two options were introduced in the early 1990s.

Subjects include literature, grammar, mathematics, music, art, physical education, environmental studies (from 1st to 6th grade), biology (from 7th grade), geography (from 7th grade), history (from 5th grade), history of art, physics (from 7th grade), chemistry (from 7th grade), one or two foreign languages (usually English, German or French). Before 1990, Russian was compulsory.

=== Secondary education ===
Secondary education usually lasts for 4 years. In gimnáziums it can also last for 5, 6 or 8 years depending on how many years the student spent in primary school. Since 1997 the numbering of years in secondary school are following that of primary school (i. e. after the 8th grade of primary school the student goes to 9th grade, which is actually the 1st year of secondary school.)

There are three kinds of high schools:

- Gimnázium (grammar school; prepares students for higher education; teaches at least 2 foreign languages)
- Technikum (Szakgimnázium) (secondary vocational school. It also provides a "secondary school leaving examination" opening higher education curriculum. )
- Szakközépiskola (vocational school. It also offers "bridge" programs to help low achieving students in primary school to catch up and join the usual vocational school curriculum)

After finishing high school, students take a school-leaving exam (Matura or final exam, érettségi in Hungarian). From 2005 this consists of exams on five subjects: written exam in mathematics, verbal and written exams in Hungarian literature and grammar, a foreign language, history, and written and/or verbal exam in a subject of the student's choice. These exams also serve as an entry exam to universities and colleges.

==== New secondary form until the school year of 2004/2005 ====
Many of the gimnáziums have begun to teach a foreign language intensively (usually 12–14 lessons a week) and IT (usually 3–4 lessons a week) in the first year. This is called nyelvi előkészítő évfolyam, literally "Language training class", or simply nulladik évfolyam (literally "0th grade"). After 2005, students will have fewer foreign language lessons and IT.

At schools where there is no nulladik évfolyam (beginners classes), they may be required to introduce them because the majority of Hungarians do not speak more than one language, or only speak their parents' language or dialect. Most students will finish High School at the age of 18 or 19, or when they complete Year 13.

Those who had at least an intermediate level language exam weren't required to pass a language exam at Matura, but has become compulsory since 2006. In language training classes, a student must pass an intermediate level language exam in the second year, and the same level Matura in the third year.

=== Higher education ===
Higher education in Hungary dates back to 1367 when Louis the Great founded the first Hungarian university in the city of Pécs.

Higher education is divided between colleges and universities. College education generally lasts for 4 years, while university education lasts for 4 to 6 years depending on the course undertaken. Vocational curriculum usually last 2 years: they are opened to secondary vocational school's graduates, and eventually vocational school students (after 5 years of work in the desired field or after a two-year program leading to a "secondary school leaving certificate"). University PhD courses usually take 3 years to complete.

Before students get their degree, they must pass an intermediate level language exam in the foreign language of their choice. English and German are the most popular. The number of Spanish-learners has been growing in the last few years. Recently a high number of students chose Esperanto and Romani languages. Both are said to have a relatively small vocabulary and easy grammar.

In 1999 there were 62 institutes of higher education in Hungary serving 280000 students.

=== Vocational schools ===
This school type (in Hungarian: szakiskola) typically provides general and pre-vocational education in grades 9 and 10, normally followed by three or two years of VET. At the end of their studies, students will acquire a qualification (ISCED 2C or mostly 3C).

== Foreign students in Hungary ==
Hungary attracts foreign students from both EU and non-EU countries. Three quarters of the students arriving in Hungary arrive from just ten countries, while one quarter of the students arrives from another 100 countries. Among the countries sending the most students are Germany, Iran, Norway, Israel and Sweden, while the majority of guest students are citizens of the neighbouring countries. In the 2008/2009 academic year, the total number of foreign students studying in Hungary was 16 916, while this number was only 14 491 in 2005/2006. The figures are increasing owing to the following advantages:

- Hungary offers affordable tuition fees and living costs within the European Union and Schengen area;
- A number of Nobel Prize Winners and scientific inventors were educated there;
- There are easier admission procedures and fewer documents are needed for obtaining admission;
- Hungary offers different types of scholarships for foreigners;
- The cost of student accommodation in Hungary is lower than in most Western European Countries and Scandinavia.
- Many education programmes are offered in English and/or German;
- Hungarian embassies issue education visas more easily than other European Union and Schengen Member States;
- Residence permits issued in Hungary for foreign students allow them to travel to other Schengen countries without any further visa;
- A number of low cost flights connect Hungarian cities to other countries and popular travel destinations;
- There are employment opportunities in the European Union during education years and after graduation, etc.

=== Preparatory courses ===
Students interested in continuing their studies in Hungary will find preparatory courses in numerous universities from Debrecen to Budapest, from Budapest to Szeged, from Szeged to Pécs.

== See also ==
- List of schools in Hungary
- Category:Schools in Hungary
- Gymnasium
- Matura
- OKTV
- Open access in Hungary to scholarly communication
- School social work in Hungary
- Ballagás

== Sources ==
- Number of enrolled students
- About educational attainment (data from 2000)
- About the educational budget (Hungarian only)
