= Badham =

Badham is a surname shared by several notable people, among them being:

People born in Australia

- Van Badham (b. 1974), Australian-British playwright

People born in Canada

- John Badham (sportscaster) (1937–2016), Canadian sportscaster and radio announcer

People born in the United Kingdom

- Charles Badham (1780–1845), British physician and classical scholar
- Charles Badham (1813–1884), British-Australian academic and classical scholar
- Charles David Badham (1805–1857), British physician, mycologist, and writer
- Edward Badham (1862–1949), English police sergeant involved in the investigation of the Jack the Ripper murders
- Jack Badham (1919–1992), English footballer
- John Badham (Note: J. Badham and M. Badham are siblings) (b. 1939), English-American film director
- Molly Badham (1914–2007), English zoologist
- Paul Badham (b. 1942), British academic

People born in the United States

- Mary Badham (b. 1952), American actress
- Robert Badham (1929–2005), American national politician
- William Terry Badham (1895–1991), American observer ace

People born in other places

- Badhan, Persian governor of pre-Islamic Yemen

== See also ==
- Badam (disambiguation)
- Badhan (disambiguation)
- Badham's blue
- Nightmare in Badham County
