= Studenec =

Studenec may refer to places:

== Czech Republic ==
- Studenec (Semily District), a municipality and village in the Liberec Region
- Studenec (Třebíč District), a municipality and village in the Vysočina Region
- Studenec, a village and part of Čelechovice na Hané in the Olomouc Region
- Studenec, a hamlet and part of Nicov in the South Bohemian Region
- Studenec, a village and part of Oloví in the Karlovy Vary Region
- Studenec, a village and part of Svojanov in the Pardubice Region
- Studenec, a village and part of Trutnov in the Hradec Králové Region

== Slovakia ==
- Studenec (Levoča District), a municipality and village in the Prešov Region
- Banský Studenec, a municipality and village in the Banská Bystrica Region

== Slovenia ==
- Studenec, Postojna, a village in the Inner Carniola region
- Studenec na Blokah, a village in the Inner Carniola region
- Studenec pri Krtini, a settlement in the Upper Carniola region
- Studenec (Ljubljana), a formerly independent settlement in the City Municipality of Ljubljana
- Studenec, Sevnica, a settlement in the municipality of Sevnica
