= Badam =

Badam may refer to:

- Almond, in Hindi, Persian and Urdu languages
- Badam River, a river of southern Kazakhstan
- Badam, Kerman, a village in Saghder Rural District, Jebalbarez District, Jiroft County, Kerman Province, Iran
- Badam-e Dan, a village in Maskun Rural District, Jebalbarez District, Jiroft County, Kerman Province, Iran
- Badam, West Azerbaijan, a village in Mokriyan-e Sharqi Rural District, in the Central District of Mahabad County, West Azerbaijan Province, Iran

== See also ==
- Badami (disambiguation)
- Badan (disambiguation)
- Badham
