= Moste District =

Moste District Četrtna skupnost Moste
- District
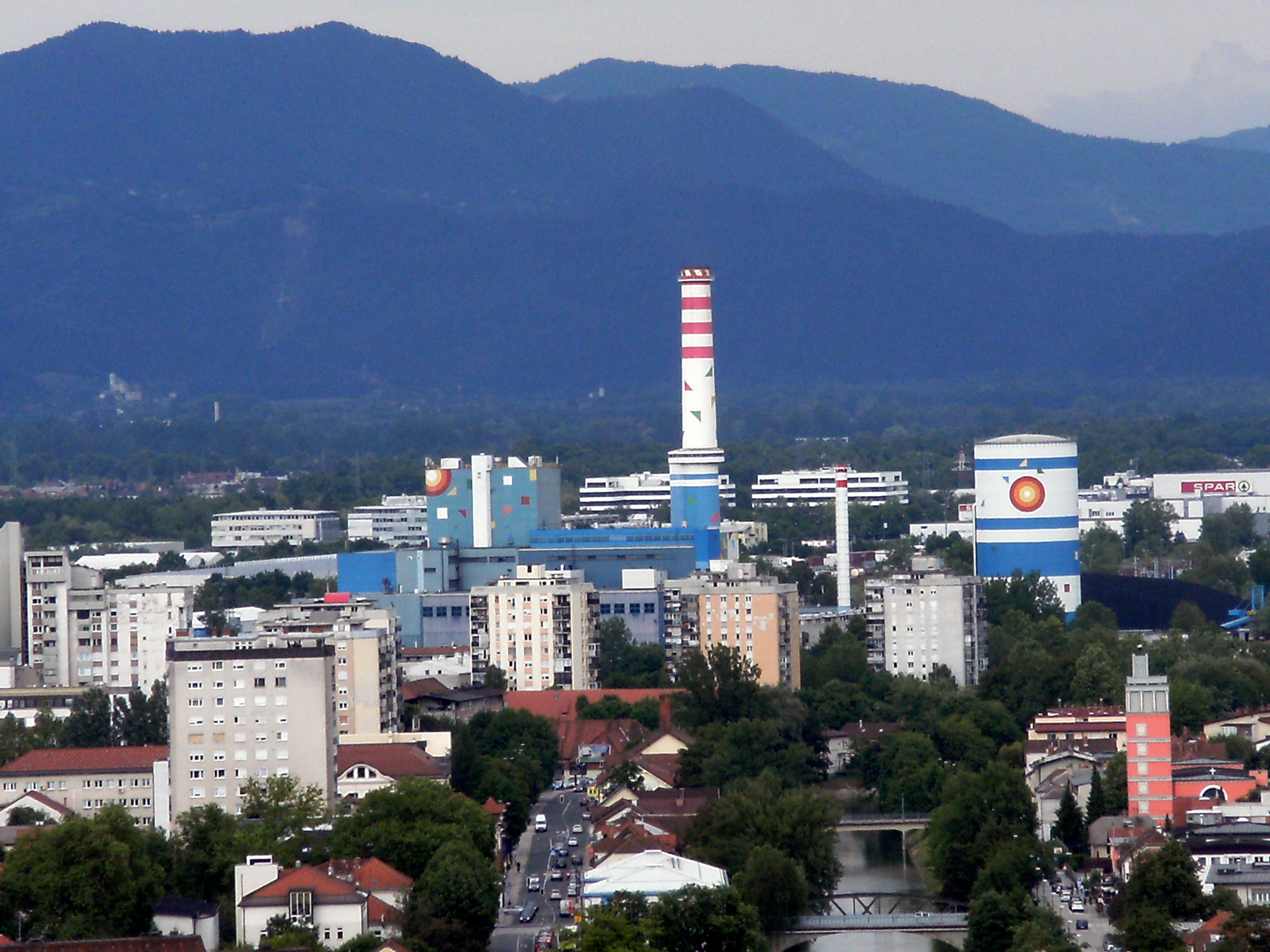

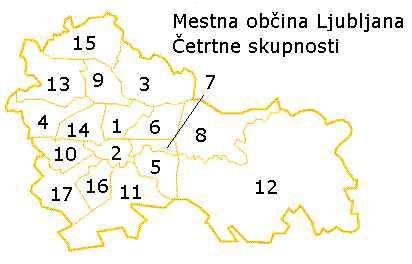
- Map of districts in Ljubljana. The Moste District is number 7.

- Location in Slovenia
- Coordinates: 46°04′07″N 14°32′02″E
- Country: Slovenia
- Traditional region: Upper Carniola
- Statistical region: Central Slovenia
- Municipality: Ljubljana

Area
  - Total: 3.40 km^{2} (1.31 sq mi)

Population (2014)
  - Total: 22,015

The Moste District (pronounced [ˈmoːstɛ]; Slovene: Četrtna skupnost Moste), or simply Moste, is a district (mestna četrt) of the City Municipality of Ljubljana. It encompasses the east-central part of Ljubljana, the capital of Slovenia. It is named after the former village of Moste.

== Geography ==
The Moste District is bounded on the north by the railroad to Dobova, on the east by the A1 Freeway, on the south by the Gruber Canal in the western part, but mostly by the Ljubljanica River, and on the west by the railroad to Metlika. The district includes the former villages of Moste, Selo, Studenec, and Vodmat. The Kodeljevo Sports Park, Ljubljana Power Station, and Selo Mansion are located in Moste. The district is traversed by the Path of Remembrance and Comradeship and by the Ljubljana Eastern Bypass. It is part of the traditional region of Upper Carniola and is now included with the rest of the municipality in the Central Slovenia Statistical Region.
