= Badami (disambiguation) =

Badami (originally Vatapi) is a town in Karnataka, India.

Badami may also refer to:

== Historical Badami and its associations ==
- Badami cave temples, a complex of Hindu and Jain cave temples

== Contemporary organizations and places in or near Badami ==
- Badami Assembly constituency, one of 224 assembly constituencies in Karnataka
- Badami railway station
- Gonal, Badami, a village near to and politically associated with Badami

== Other places ==
- Badami Oil Field, an oil field in the Alaska North Slope

== People ==
- Andrea Badami (1913–2002), an American painter
- Anita Rau Badami (born 24 September 1961), an Indo-Canadian writer
- Stefano Badami (December 10, 1888 – March 31, 1955), first boss of the Elizabeth crime family
- Chris Badami, an American musician, record producer and audio engineer
- Sarvottam Badami (1910–2005), Indian film director
- Venkatrao K. Badami (12 January 1888 – c. 1950), an Indian agronomist and a pioneer of plant breeding
- Waseem Badami, Pakistani television host and news anchor

== See also ==
- Badam (disambiguation)
- Vatapi Ganapatim, a hymn to the Hindu god Ganesha
- Vatapi Ganapati, a Hindu temple
- Vatapi, a nephew of Prahalada in Hinduism
