= Badan =

Badan may refer to:

== Arts and media ==
=== Films ===
- Do Badan, a 1966 Hindi film directed by Raj Khosla
- Jalte Badan, a 1973 Bollywood drama
- Kora Badan, a 1974 Bollywood drama directed by B.S. Ghad
- Kunwara Badan, a 1973 Bollywood drama directed by Vimal Tiwari

=== Other media ===
- Badan Empire, a fictional organization in the TV special Birth of the 10th! Kamen Riders All Together!! and the manga Kamen Rider Spirits

== Organizations ==
- Badan Informasi Geospasial, the national surveying and mapping agency of Indonesia
- Badan Warisan Malaysia, an NGO formed in 1983, concerned with conservation of Malaysia's built heritage
- Badan Standardisasi Nasional, the International Organization for Standardization (ISO) member body for Indonesia

== Other uses ==
- Badan (ship), a type of dhow
- Badan, a fluorescent probe molecule, analogue of Prodan
- Baďan, a village and municipality in the Banská Bystrica Region of Slovakia
- Badhan, Sanaag, a city and district in northeastern Somalia
- Badan Chandra Borphukan, Indian military leader
- Bergenia crassifolia, a plant

== See also ==
- Badhan (disambiguation)
- Badam (disambiguation)
