= Church of Saint Martin, Nicov =

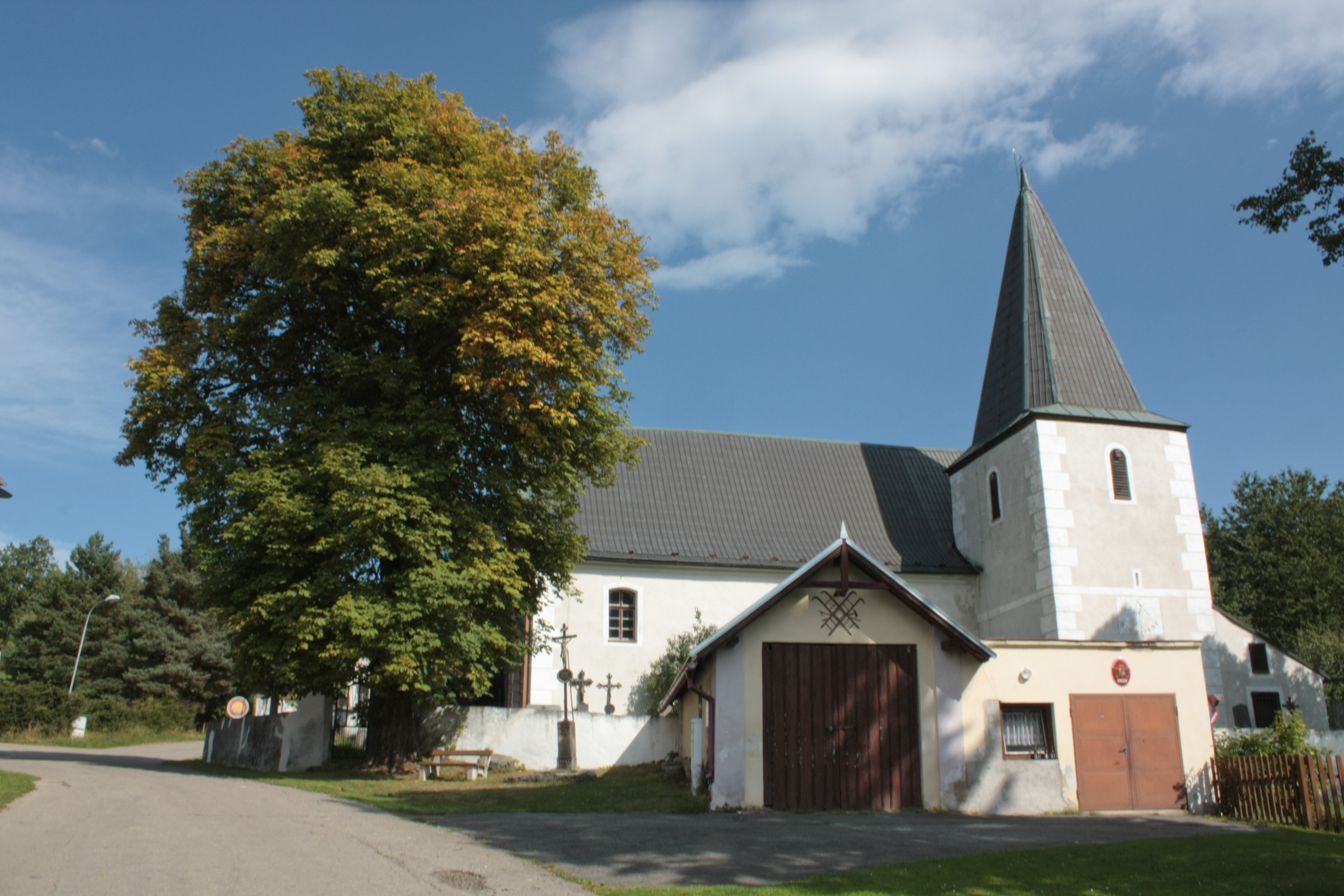
- 49°07′31.47″N 13°37′13.56″E
- Address: Nicov 8, 384 73 Nicov
- Country: Czech Republic
- Denomination: Catholic
- Churchmanship: Parish church

History
- Dedication: Saints Wenceslaus and Martin of Tours

Administration
- District: Prachatice
- Province: South Bohemian Region

The Church of Saint Martin is a Catholic church in Nicov in the South Bohemian Region of the Czech Republic. It is the main landmark of the village, mainly due to its high elevation. The church is surrounded by a cemetery with a fence wall and a gate. Historic preservation applies to the church grounds as well as the adjacent cemetery.

It was probably built in the 1220s–1240s. At an altitude of almost 900 metres (3,000 ft), it is the highest elevated Romanesque church in the Czech Republic.

== Architecture and church interior ==
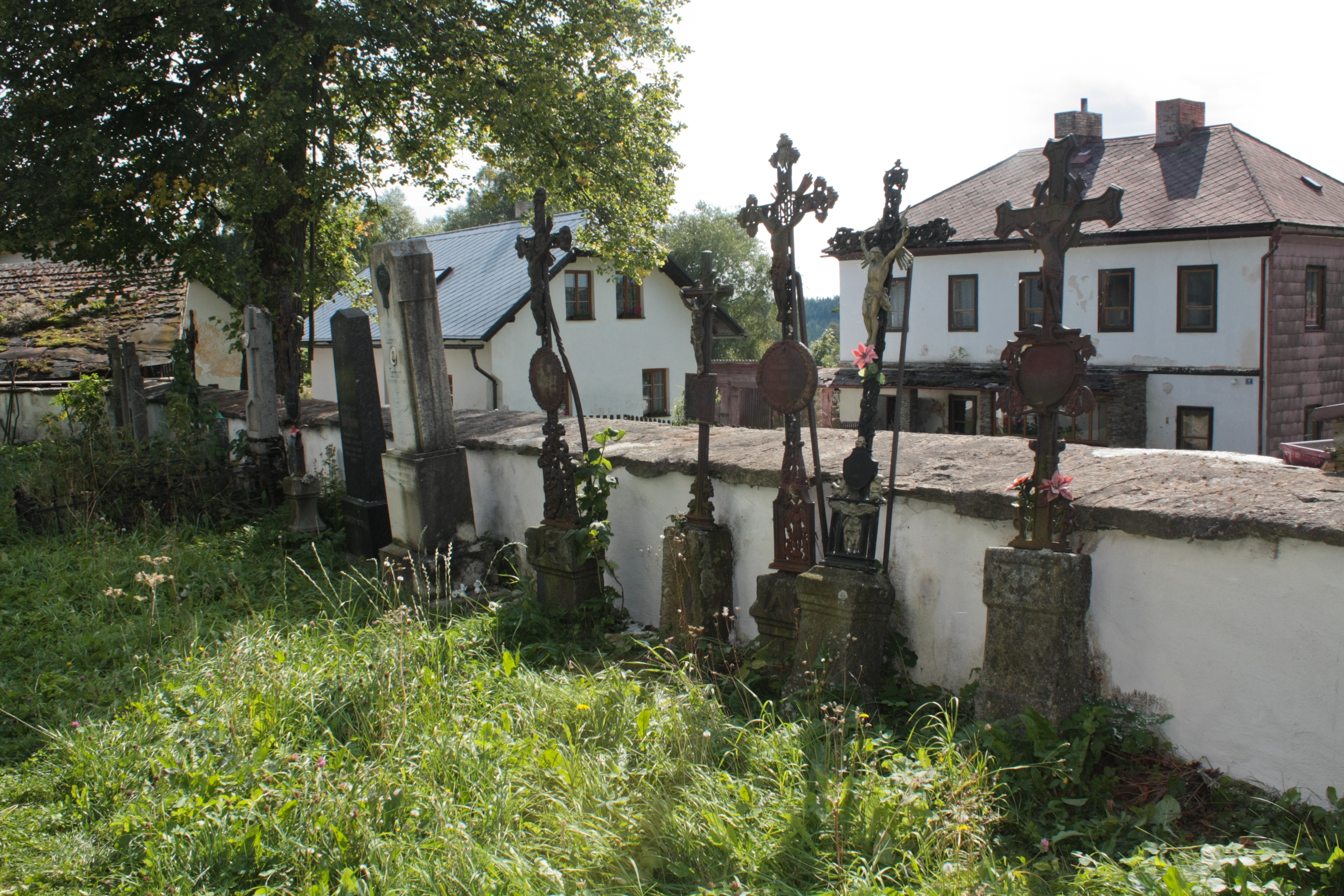
Cemetery

The Church of St. Martin is a single-nave building with a square chancel and a prismatic tower. The front of the nave, which has a segmental window on the ground floor, projects a simple Baroque gable. The longitudinal sides are divided by three inwardly-niched windows (the two closer together are in place of the old ones). A preserved original Romanesque window is situated in the back of the eastern wall. These premises are covered by a single shingle roof. Adjacent to the right side of the nave stands an old (lowered) tower with a hipped roof. There are narrow square inwardly widened windows on the ground floor. The upper floor has semicircular arched windows made of simple bricks opening to the three open sides. The nave is rectangular with a flat ceiling, the triumphal arch is semicircular, girded by a mortar cornice and divides the nave from the cross-vaulted chancel. The church was originally a Romanesque single-nave building, rebuilt and modified in the Baroque style. The Gothic mounded vault under the tower, the Baroque cross vault without ribs along with the chancel and the roof trusses add to the historic value. A walled Romanesque window remains on the eastern side. A tower with a hipped roof adjoins the south wall of the church. In the 19th century, the nave was lengthened (to 14 metres) and the tower was lowered.

The nave, over 14 metres (46 ft) long with a flat ceiling, is separated from the presbytery by a triumphal arch accentuated by pilasters with simple capitals. In 1866, a sacristy and a vestibule were added.

The interior of the church is protected under historic preservation. The late Baroque portal altar is the work of an unknown artist from the second half of the 18th century. The wooden sculpture of St. Martin on horseback with a kneeling beggar is decorated by the city walls. St. Martin is complemented by statues of St. Isidore (patron saint of ploughmen), St. Notburga (patron saint of grain harvesters), St. Wendelin and St. Leonard (patron saints of cattle breeders). The concept of the sculptures suggests inspiration from similar sculptures in Bavaria. In 2004, some parts of the altar were stolen. According to another source, Emanuel Poche and the Church of St. Martin, the confessionals are decorated by statues of Mary Magdalene and St. Jerome, and statues of St. Joseph, St. Peter, St. Paul and the Virgin Mary on the pilasters of the triumphal arch and in the nave.

The church has a valuable organ from 1811 (probably the work of organ builder Gartner of Tachov). The bell with the inscription of the names of the Four Evangelists in a Gothic majuscule dates from the 14th century.
