= Badhen =

Badhen may refer to:

- An alternative spelling of any of Badhan (disambiguation)
- An alternative spelling of Badchen
