= Vysoká, Banská Štiavnica District =

Vysoká Magaslak
- Municipality
- Flag

- Location of Vysoká in the Banská Bystrica Region Location of Vysoká in Slovakia
- Country: Slovakia
- Region: Banská Bystrica Region
- District: Banská Štiavnica District
- First mentioned: 1388

Area
  - Total: 14.54 km^{2} (5.61 sq mi)
- Elevation: 669 m (2,195 ft)

Population (2025)
  - Total: 124
- Time zone: UTC+1 (CET)
  - Summer (DST): UTC+2 (CEST)
- Postal code: 969 01
- Area code: +421 45
- Vehicle registration plate (until 2022): BS
- Website: www.obecvysoka.sk

Vysoká (Hungarian: Magaslak) is a village and municipality in Banská Štiavnica District, in the Banská Bystrica Region of Slovakia.

== Population ==
Population statistic (10 years)
Year	1995	2005	2015	2025
Count	142	147	144	124
Difference		+3.52%	−2.04%	−13.88%

Population statistic
Year	2024	2025
Count	126	124
Difference		−1.58%

It has a population of 124 people (31 December 2025).

=== Ethnicity ===
Census 2021 (1+ %)
Ethnicity	Number	Fraction
Slovak	126	97.67%
Not found out	2	1.55%
Total	129	

In year 2021 was 129 people by ethnicity 126 as Slovak, 2 as Not found out and 1 as Hungarian.

Note on population: The difference values of population numbers in the table "Population statistic" and in the sections "Ethnicity" & "Religion" is caused by the use of various statistical methods.

=== Religion ===
Census 2021 (1+ %)
Religion	Number	Fraction
Roman Catholic Church	100	77.52%
None	21	16.28%
Evangelical Church	6	4.65%
Not found out	2	1.55%
Total	129	

In year 2021 was 129 people by religion 100 from Roman Catholic Church, 21 from None, 6 from Evangelical Church and 2 from Not found out.
