= Močiar =

Močiar Kövesmocsár
- Municipality
- Flag

- Location of Močiar in the Banská Bystrica Region Location of Močiar in Slovakia
- Coordinates: 48.54°N 18.95°E
- Country: Slovakia
- Region: Banská Bystrica Region
- District: Banská Štiavnica District
- First mentioned: 1305

Government
  - Mayor: Adriana Vančová

Area
  - Total: 20.91 km^{2} (8.07 sq mi)
- Elevation: 593 m (1,946 ft)

Population (2025)
  - Total: 160
- Time zone: UTC+1 (CET)
  - Summer (DST): UTC+2 (CEST)
- Postal code: 969 82
- Area code: +421 45
- Vehicle registration plate (until 2022): BS
- Website: www.mociar.sk

Močiar (Hungarian: Kövesmocsár) is a village and municipality in Banská Štiavnica District, in the Banská Bystrica Region of Slovakia.

== Geography ==
The municipality lies at an altitude of 593 metres (1,946 ft) and covers an area of 20.91 km^{2} (8.07 sq mi) (2025).

== Population ==
Population statistic (10 years)
Year	1995	2005	2015	2025
Count	196	153	165	160
Difference		−21.93%	+7.84%	−3.03%

Population statistic
Year	2024	2025
Count	165	160
Difference		−3.03%

It has a population of 160 people (31 December 2025).

=== Ethnicity ===
Census 2021 (1+ %)
Ethnicity	Number	Fraction
Slovak	160	98.15%
Not found out	4	2.45%
Total	163	

In year 2021 was 163 people by ethnicity 160 as Slovak and 4 as Not found out.

Note on population: The difference values of population numbers in the table "Population statistic" and in the sections "Ethnicity" & "Religion" is caused by the use of various statistical methods.

=== Religion ===
Census 2021 (1+ %)
Religion	Number	Fraction
Roman Catholic Church	135	82.82%
None	22	13.5%
Not found out	3	1.84%
Evangelical Church	3	1.84%
Total	163	

In year 2021 was 163 people by religion 135 from Roman Catholic Church, 22 from None, 3 from Not found out and 3 from Evangelical Church.
