= Banská Štiavnica District =

Coordinates: 48°27′31″N 18°53′35″E

- District
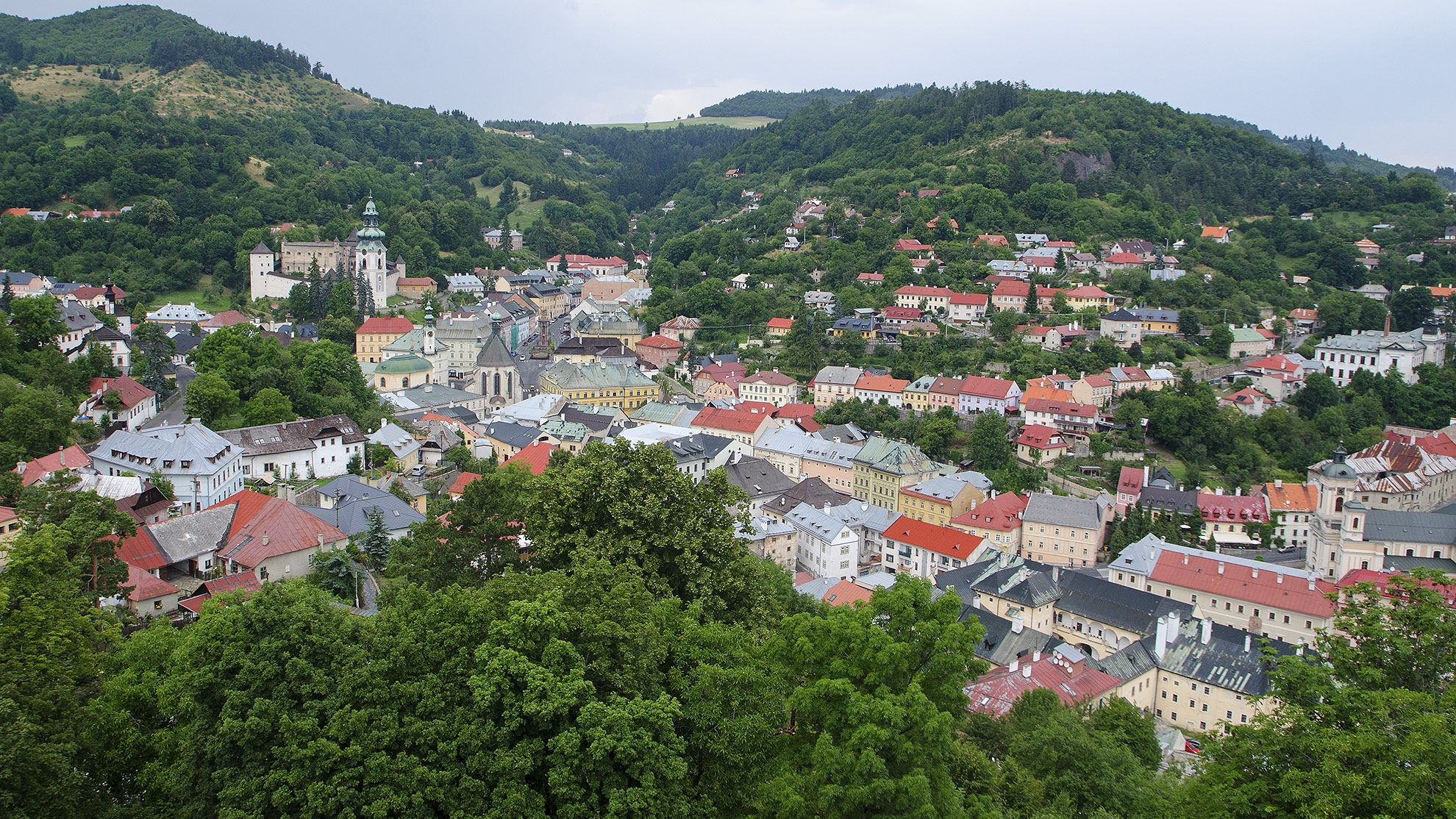
- Country: Slovakia
- Region (kraj): Banská Bystrica Region
- Seat: Banská Štiavnica

Area
  - Total: 292.29 km^{2} (112.85 sq mi)

Population (2025)
  - Total: 15,258
- Time zone: UTC+1 (CET)
  - Summer (DST): UTC+2 (CEST)
- Telephone prefix: 045
- Vehicle registration plate (until 2022): BS
- Municipalities: 15

Banská Štiavnica District (Slovak: okres Banská Štiavnica; Hungarian: Selmecbányai járás) is a district in the Banská Bystrica Region of central Slovakia. Until 1920, most of the present-day district belonged to the county of Kingdom of Hungary of Hont, apart from Močiar and Podhorie in the north (Tekov) and Kozelník in the east (Zvolen county).

== Population ==
Population statistic (10 years)
| Year | 1995 | 2005 | 2015 | 2025 |
|---|---|---|---|---|
| Count | 17,006 | 16,937 | 16,314 | 15,258 |
| Difference | | −0.40% | −3.67% | −6.47% |

Population statistic
| Year | 2024 | 2025 |
|---|---|---|
| Count | 15,350 | 15,258 |
| Difference | | −0.59% |

It has a population of 15,258 people (31 December 2025).

Historical population
| Year | Pop. | ±% |
|---|---|---|
| 1970 | 17,868 | — |
| 1980 | 16,922 | −5.3% |
| 1991 | 17,324 | +2.4% |
| 2001 | 17,151 | −1.0% |
| 2011 | 16,595 | −3.2% |
| 2021 | 15,649 | −5.7% |
Source: Statistical Office of the Slovak Republic

=== Ethnicity ===
Census 2021 (1+ %)
| Ethnicity | Number | Fraction |
|---|---|---|
| Slovak | 15,048 | 94.1% |
| Not found out | 443 | 2.77% |
| Total | 15,991 | |

In year 2021 was 15,991 people by ethnicity 15,048 as Slovak, 443 as Not found out, 144 as Romani, 96 as Czech, 62 as Hungarian, 52 as Other, 30 as German, 15 as Italian, 15 as Russian, 13 as Rusyn, 11 as Polish, 10 as Austrian, 9 as Ukrainian, 9 as Romanian, 7 as Jewish, 7 as Irish, 5 as Serbian, 5 as Moravian, 3 as Iranian, 2 as Bulgarian, 1 as Canadian, 1 as Greek, 1 as Croatian, 1 as English and 1 as Albanian.

Note on population: The difference values of population numbers in the table "Population statistic" and in the sections "Ethnicity" & "Religion" is caused by the use of various statistical methods.

=== Religion ===
Census 2021 (1+ %)
| Religion | Number | Fraction |
|---|---|---|
| Roman Catholic Church | 8655 | 55.31% |
| None | 4700 | 30.03% |
| Evangelical Church | 1160 | 7.41% |
| Not found out | 651 | 4.16% |
| Total | 15,649 | |

In year 2021 was 15,649 people by religion 8655 from Roman Catholic Church, 4700 from None, 1160 from Evangelical Church, 651 from Not found out, 87 from Greek Catholic Church, 75 from Other and not ascertained christian church, 51 from Christian Congregations in Slovakia, 44 from Ad hoc movements, 38 from Other, 32 from Jehovah's Witnesses, 28 from Buddhism, 26 from Baptists Church, 23 from Seventh-day Adventist Church, 15 from Calvinist Church, 12 from Eastern Orthodox Church, 10 from Paganism and natural spirituality, 10 from Islam, 6 from Apostolic Church, 5 from Hinduism, 4 from Jewish community, 4 from Old Catholic Church, 4 from Church of the Brethren, 3 from United Methodist Church, 3 from Bahá'i Community, 2 from New Apostolic Church and 1 from Czechoslovak Hussite Church.

== Municipalities ==
| Municipality | Area [km^{2}] | Population |
|---|---|---|
| Baďan | 15.10 | 147 |
| Banská Belá | 21.07 | 1,139 |
| Banská Štiavnica | 32.88 | 9,208 |
| Banský Studenec | 19.19 | 458 |
| Beluj | 22.81 | 134 |
| Dekýš | 17.82 | 181 |
| Ilija | 10.62 | 354 |
| Kozelník | 9.01 | 176 |
| Močiar | 20.91 | 160 |
| Počúvadlo | 15.51 | 87 |
| Podhorie | 21.63 | 328 |
| Prenčov | 24.50 | 623 |
| Svätý Anton | 22.60 | 1,290 |
| Štiavnické Bane | 10.15 | 849 |
| Vysoká | 14.54 | 124 |

Population and area values are current for year 2025.
