= Ilija, Slovakia =

Ilija Illés
- Municipality
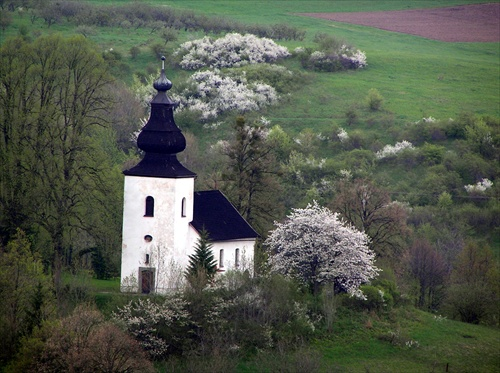

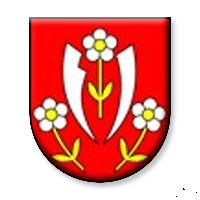
- Flag Coat of arms

- Location of Ilija in the Banská Bystrica Region Location of Ilija in Slovakia
- Coordinates: 48°25′N 18°54′E
- Country: Slovakia
- Region: Banská Bystrica Region
- District: Banská Štiavnica District
- First mentioned: 1266

Area
  - Total: 10.62 km^{2} (4.10 sq mi)
- Elevation: 497 m (1,631 ft)

Population (2025)
  - Total: 354
- Time zone: UTC+1 (CET)
  - Summer (DST): UTC+2 (CEST)
- Postal code: 969 03
- Area code: +421 45
- Vehicle registration plate (until 2022): BS
- Website: www.obecilija.sk

Ilija (German: Sankt Egidien, rarely Ilia; Hungarian: Illés, until 1891 Illia) is a village and municipality in Banská Štiavnica District, in the Banská Bystrica Region of Slovakia.

In historical records, the village was first mentioned in 1266 as Ecclesia Sancti Egidii. Until the 16th century, it belonged to the Sitno Castle, which together with its possessions belonged to the Balassa family as of 1548 and which passed to the Koháry family in 1629.

== Geography ==
The municipality lies at an altitude of 497 metres (1,631 ft) and covers an area of 10.62 km^{2} (4.10 sq mi) (2025).

== History ==
=== Middle Ages ===
1266 is a crucial year for Ilija as it appears in written monuments. In the specialist literature, the year 1254 is connected with the Saint Giles Church. The Saint Giles Church played an important role while, in its vicinity, a settlement was organizing. The Medieval settlement borrowed its name from the church's patron saint. Until 1526, Ilija is found in the written sources in its Latin form (Sanctus Egidius), Hungarized (Scenthegud, Zenth Egyed), mixed Hungarian-Slovak (Zenthlyen in 1496), but also in German as Gilg and Gilgen. Little is known about the development of Ilija in the period between the changes performed in the Saint Giles Church in 1266 and the second decade of the 14th century. That region belonged to the member of the Hunt-Poznanovcov family and its branches.

Before 1318, Ilija was in the possession of a branch of the Csáky family from Plášťovce. The name of its village is recorded as Scenthegud. In 1347 the Hungarian King, Louis the Great decided that some estates, among them, Ilija (Zentheged) owned by Ölvengovi, shall be received by Šarišský Komes Konya. The information on Ilija in further periods depends on how well the historical sources are preserved. And, after some time gap, those date back to 15th century.

=== Renaissance ===
However the sources state one important fact in the proprietary relations and determine the Ilija appurtenance till 16th century. In that period, Ilija is a part of the estate latifundium Litava. The preserved sources about Ilija as a part of the latifundium Litava – Čabraď are from the second half of the 15th century. The members of the Horvatovcov family from Selce owned the town for relatively longer time, since the 1360s.

The year 1476 was decisive for the conflict over the boundaries of the Damián Horvát’s estate as the Budyn chapter issued the declaration about the approved distribution of property of the dominium Čabraď, which, without doubt, is a valuable historical source both for Ilija as for last villages belonging to the latifundium. By the division of Ilija between the widow Frusinova and the brother-in-law, Peter Horvat, there were 8 inhabited farms in the village. This data is one of the first information on real residents of Ilija in the Middle Ages.

In 1500, Anton Nyerges fulfills the function of the alderman of Ilija. By the end of the 15th century, the proprietary relations of the dominium Čabraď were changed what was accompanied by the property disputes. Since there was no transparency in the proprietary relations and disputes were going on, the royal court was entrusted with the care of the castle.

About 1511, the castle with the villages, including Ilija, formed a part of the Archbishop Tomáš Bákociho’s estate. After his death, in 1517 King Louis II of Hungary decided that the rule would pass to the estate of the family Erdödyovcov.

In 1540, Ilija was a feudal property where 5 inhabited and one deserted peasant settlements were registered. There were 3 settlements connected with each other, so called „patvarcz“, and a mill with one wheel. At the end of November 1566, the Turks reached Ilija and Sitnianska. They set afire houses in Ilija. In 1570, Ilija belonged to the Nógrád Sandžak. The terror imbued by the Turks lasted for almost 150 years with varying intensity.

The community of medieval Ilija was engaged in farming, clearing the trees, making the charcoal. The population had to perform labor services towards the castle Litav (Čabraď) and later towards Sitno. The village was ruled by the elected alderman and alders (seniores). The traditional crafts performed in Ilija were miller’s trade, smithery and butcher’s trade. In 1599, the municipality of Ilija belonged to the castle Sitno, which was called as the authorities’ seat and a part of the defense system against the Turks and the Chetniks.

The oldest preserved inventory of Manor Estates of Sitnianskeho a Čabraďského dominium prepared by the emperor’s estate commissars comes from the year 1602. According to that inventory, there were 9 inhabited peasant settlements in Ilija.

=== The Age of Reason ===
The 17th century is important for Ilija due to the relevant changes occurred in the proprietary relations in the estates of both dominions. Those changes were taking place practically till the end of the feudal period under Hungarian conditions and finished with the Revolution 1848/1849; they marked for more than two centuries the development of Ilija and its fortune was united with that of the family Koháriovcov till the second half of the 1820s when its successors, the Koburgovcov, died out.

In the 17th and at the beginning of the 18th century, those regions became the scene of the state anti-Habsburg insurrections, which alternated with attacks of the Turks and the Mortalovcov who very often were in a conspiracy with the insurgents. In the 18th century, Ilija was, according to the works performed by its residents, a village with developed farming, timber manufacture and home craft. The insurrection of the community against the landlords the Kohariovcov was engendered in the period of Hungarian Urban reforms realized by the reigning Maria Theresa of Austria (1740–1780).

According to the notes of the inventory in 1743, there were living in Ilija 93 persons who were subject to tax, amongst them 55 were members of the lords’ of the Manor families and 38 of the families without a manor house. It is here where the name of the village is established in Slovak (Swaty Illik).

== Population ==
Population statistic (10 years)
Year	1995	2005	2015	2025
Count	351	323	347	354
Difference		−7.97%	+7.43%	+2.01%

Population statistic
Year	2024	2025
Count	350	354
Difference		+1.14%

It has a population of 354 people (31 December 2025).

=== Ethnicity ===
Census 2021 (1+%)
Ethnicity	Number	Fraction
Slovak	349	99.71%
Total	350	

In year 2021 was 350 people by ethnicity 349 as Slovak, 1 as Not found out and 1 as Other.

Note on population: The difference values of population numbers in the table "Population statistic" and in the sections "Ethnicity" & "Religion" is caused by the use of various statistical methods.

=== Religion ===
Census 2021 (1+%)
Religion	Number	Fraction
Roman Catholic Church	265	75.71%
None	63	18%
Evangelical Church	10	2.86%
Not found out	6	1.71%
Total	350	

In year 2021 was 350 people by religion 265 from Roman Catholic Church, 63 from None, 10 from Evangelical Church, 6 from Not found out, 3 from Seventh-day Adventist Church, 1 from Christian Congregations in Slovakia, 1 from Islam and 1 from Greek Catholic Church.

== See also ==
- List of municipalities and towns in Slovakia

== Genealogical resources ==
The records for genealogical research are available at the state archive "Statny Archiv in Banska Bystrica, Slovakia"

- Roman Catholic church records (births/marriages/deaths): 1689-1896 (parish B)
- Lutheran church records (births/marriages/deaths): 1678-1905 (parish B)
