= Prenčov =

Prenčov Berencsfalu
- Municipality
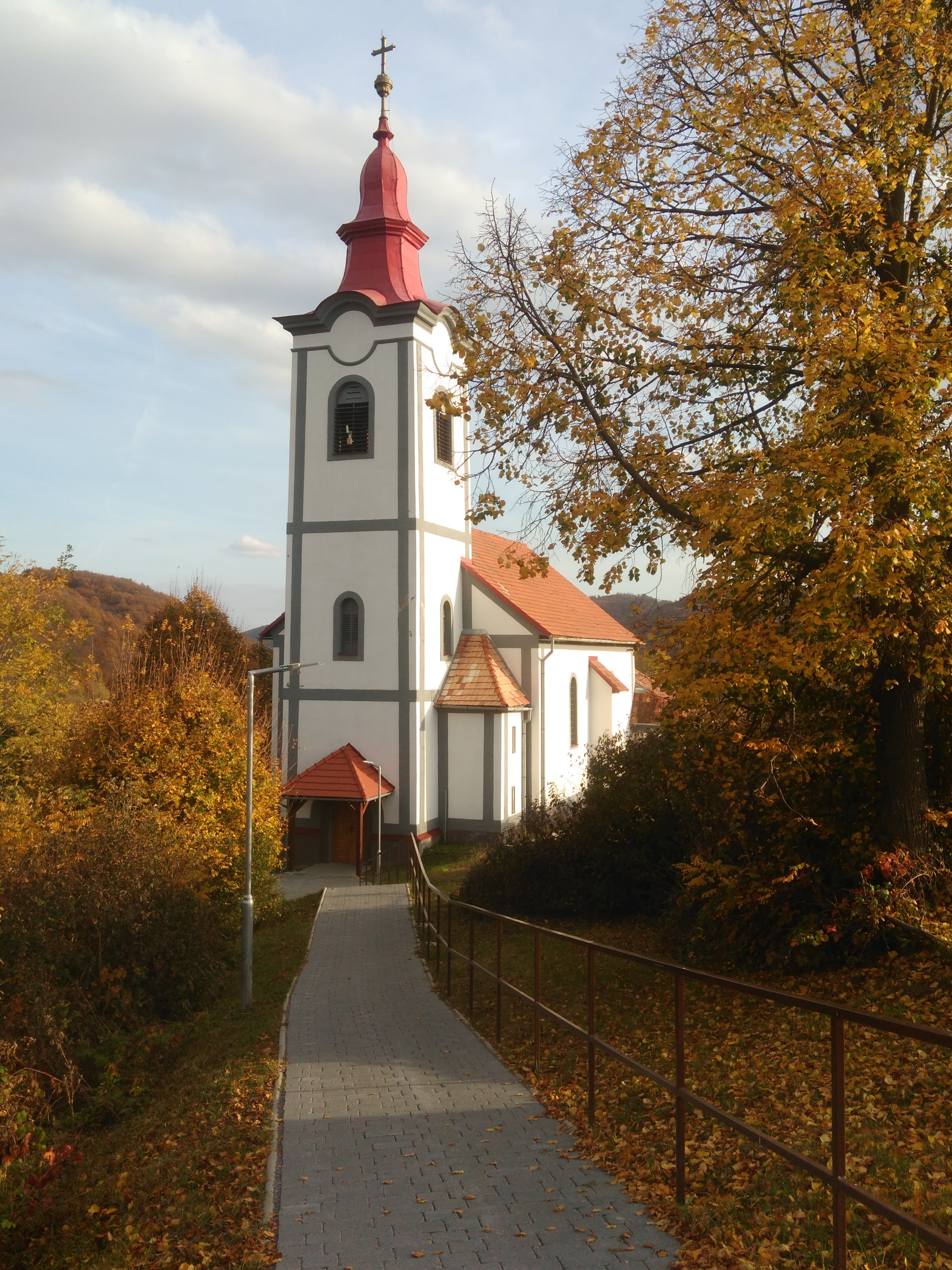
- Saint Nicholas church

- Flag Coat of arms

- Location of Prenčov in the Banská Bystrica Region Location of Prenčov in Slovakia
- Coordinates: 48.37°N 18.93°E
- Country: Slovakia
- Region: Banská Bystrica Region
- District: Banská Štiavnica District
- First mentioned: 1266

Area
  - Total: 24.50 km^{2} (9.46 sq mi)
- Elevation: 298 m (978 ft)

Population (2025)
  - Total: 623
- Time zone: UTC+1 (CET)
  - Summer (DST): UTC+2 (CEST)
- Postal code: 969 73
- Area code: +421 45
- Vehicle registration plate (until 2022): BS
- Website: www.prencov.sk

Prenčov (Hungarian: Berencsfalu) is a village and municipality in Banská Štiavnica District, in the Banská Bystrica Region of Slovakia. In 2011, it had a population of 596.

== Geography ==
The municipality lies at an altitude of 298 metres (978 ft) and covers an area of 24.50 km^{2} (9.46 sq mi) (2025).

== Population ==
Population statistic (10 years)
Year	1995	2005	2015	2025
Count	650	632	663	623
Difference		−2.76%	+4.90%	−6.03%

Population statistic
Year	2024	2025
Count	614	623
Difference		+1.46%

It has a population of 623 people (31 December 2025).

=== Ethnicity ===
Census 2021 (1+ %)
Ethnicity	Number	Fraction
Slovak	625	98.11%
Not found out	8	1.25%
Total	637	

In year 2021 was 637 people by ethnicity 625 as Slovak, 8 as Not found out, 3 as Hungarian, 2 as Romani, 1 as Czech, 1 as Polish and 1 as Other.

Note on population: The difference values of population numbers in the table "Population statistic" and in the sections "Ethnicity" & "Religion" is caused by the use of various statistical methods.

=== Religion ===
Census 2021 (1+ %)
Religion	Number	Fraction
Roman Catholic Church	414	64.99%
Evangelical Church	113	17.74%
None	88	13.81%
Not found out	20	3.14%
Total	637	

In year 2021 was 637 people by religion 414 from Roman Catholic Church, 113 from Evangelical Church, 88 from None, 20 from Not found out, 1 from Paganism and natural spirituality and 1 from Other.
