= Banská Belá =

Banská Belá Bélabánya
- Municipality
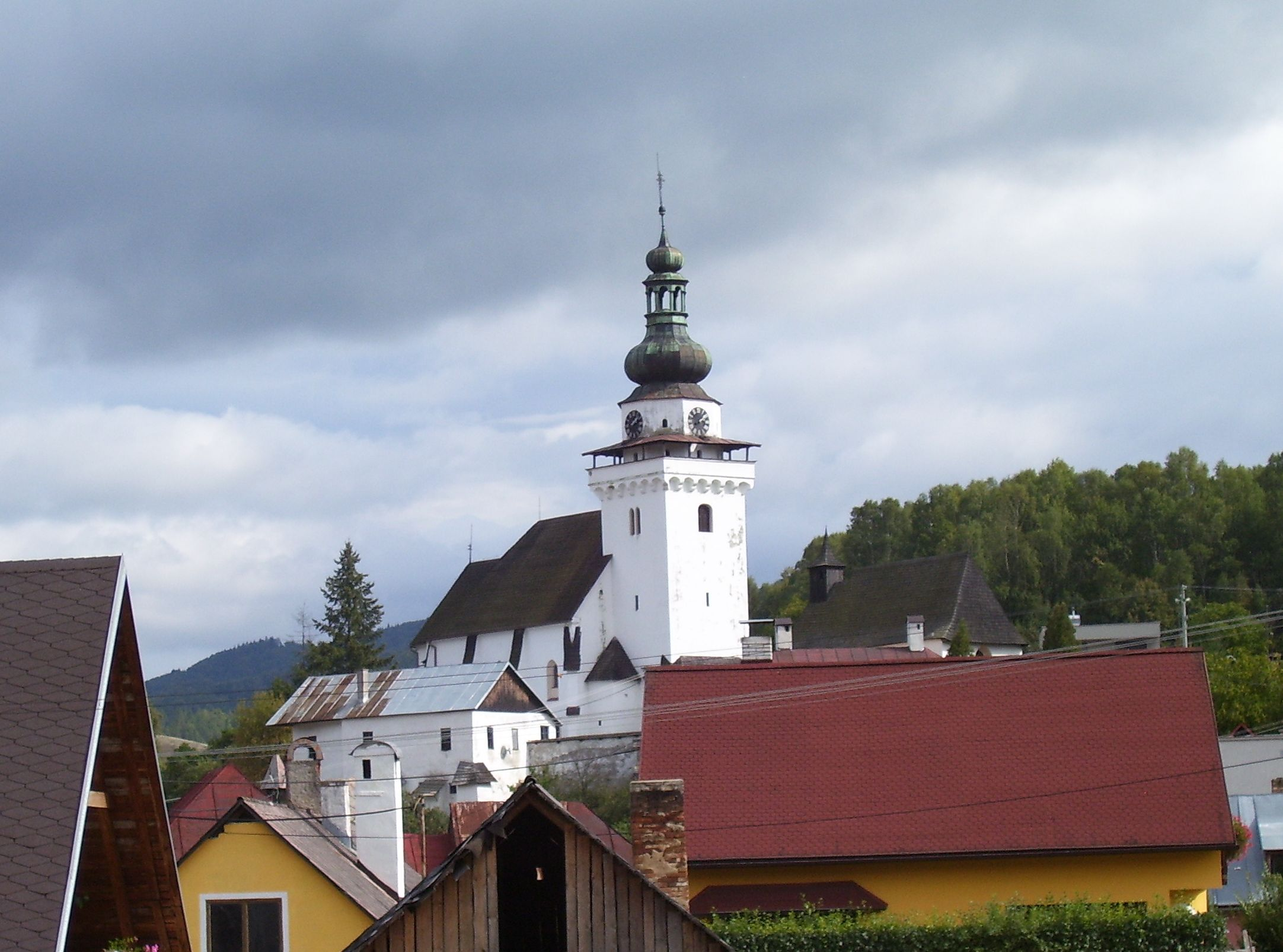

- Flag

- Location of Banská Belá in the Banská Bystrica Region Location of Banská Belá in Slovakia
- Coordinates: 48.48°N 18.93°E
- Country: Slovakia
- Region: Banská Bystrica Region
- District: Banská Štiavnica District
- First mentioned: 1228

Area
  - Total: 21.07 km^{2} (8.14 sq mi)
- Elevation: 469 m (1,539 ft)

Population (2025)
  - Total: 1,139
- Time zone: UTC+1 (CET)
  - Summer (DST): UTC+2 (CEST)
- Postal code: 966 15
- Area code: +421 45
- Vehicle registration plate (until 2022): BS
- Website: www.banskabela.sk

Banská Belá (German: Dilln; Hungarian: Bélabánya) is a village and municipality in the Banská Štiavnica District, in the Banská Bystrica Region of central Slovakia. It has a population of 1,234.

== Names and etymology ==
The settlement got its name after the creek Biela (1228 torrens Bela, now Starý potok), in Slovak "white". The village founded on the creek was named Bana (a mine), later Biela Bana to distinguish between Banská Belá and Banská Štiavnica which was called also Bana. The Hungarian name Feyerbanya and its variations are translations of the Slovak name. The origin of the German name Dilln is uncertain.

The first written mention is probably terra nomine bela (1288), older sources mention also an unreliable record terra banensium (1156).

== History ==
The village arose by separation from Banská Štiavnica, but it was part of Banská Štiavnica again from 1873 to 1954.

King Béla IV invited German miners from Banská Štiavnica and the village got the German name Dilln (Dyln, Dilln, Dylen). The village suffered from Turkish raids during the Ottoman wars.

== Geography ==
The municipality lies at an altitude of 469 metres (1,539 ft) and covers an area of 21.07 km^{2} (8.14 sq mi) (2025).

== Population ==
Population statistic (10 years)
Year	1995	2005	2015	2025
Count	1250	1242	1186	1139
Difference		−0.64%	−4.50%	−3.96%

Population statistic
Year	2024	2025
Count	1154	1139
Difference		−1.29%

It has a population of 1139 people (31 December 2025).

=== Ethnicity ===
Census 2021 (1+ %)
Ethnicity	Number	Fraction
Slovak	1110	94.79%
Not found out	53	4.52%
Total	1171	

In year 2021 was 1171 people by ethnicity 1110 as Slovak, 53 as Not found out, 8 as Czech, 7 as Romani, 5 as Other, 3 as Ukrainian, 3 as Moravian, 2 as German, 1 as Italian, 1 as Polish, 1 as Hungarian and 1 as Canadian.

Note on population: The difference values of population numbers in the table "Population statistic" and in the sections "Ethnicity" & "Religion" is caused by the use of various statistical methods.

=== Religion ===
Census 2021 (1+ %)
Religion	Number	Fraction
Roman Catholic Church	712	60.8%
None	282	24.08%
Evangelical Church	96	8.2%
Not found out	56	4.78%
Total	1171	

In year 2021 was 1171 people by religion 712 from Roman Catholic Church, 282 from None, 96 from Evangelical Church, 56 from Not found out, 5 from Other and not ascertained christian church, 5 from Greek Catholic Church, 4 from Calvinist Church, 3 from Jehovah's Witnesses, 2 from Eastern Orthodox Church, 2 from Paganism and natural spirituality, 1 from Christian Congregations in Slovakia, 1 from United Methodist Church, 1 from Czechoslovak Hussite Church and 1 from Ad hoc movements.

== Genealogical resources ==
The records for genealogical research are available at the state archive in Banská Bystrica (Slovak: Štátny archív v Banskej Bystrici).

- Roman Catholic church records (births/marriages/deaths): 1688-1895(parish A)
- Lutheran church records (births/marriages/deaths): 1678-1905(parish B)

== See also ==
- List of municipalities and towns in Slovakia
