= Podhorie, Banská Štiavnica District =

Podhorie Teplafőszékely
- Municipality
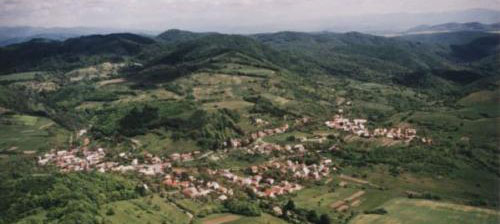

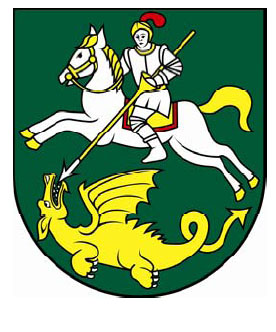
- Flag Coat of arms

- Location of Podhorie in the Banská Bystrica Region Location of Podhorie in Slovakia
- Country: Slovakia
- Region: Banská Bystrica Region
- District: Banská Štiavnica District
- First mentioned: 1388

Area
  - Total: 21.63 km^{2} (8.35 sq mi)
- Elevation: 581 m (1,906 ft)

Population (2025)
  - Total: 328
- Time zone: UTC+1 (CET)
  - Summer (DST): UTC+2 (CEST)
- Postal code: 969 82
- Area code: +421 45
- Vehicle registration plate (until 2022): BS
- Website: www.podhorie.sk

Podhorie (Hungarian: Teplafőszékely) is a village and municipality in Banská Štiavnica District in the Banská Bystrica Region of Slovakia.

== Population ==
Population statistic (10 years)
Year	1995	2005	2015	2025
Count	401	374	327	328
Difference		−6.73%	−12.56%	+0.30%

Population statistic
Year	2024	2025
Count	334	328
Difference		−1.79%

It has a population of 328 people (31 December 2025).

=== Ethnicity ===
Census 2021 (1+ %)
Ethnicity	Number	Fraction
Slovak	325	98.78%
Total	329	

In year 2021 was 329 people by ethnicity 325 as Slovak, 2 as Jewish, 2 as Not found out, 2 as German, 1 as Italian, 1 as Hungarian and 1 as Other.

Note on population: The difference values of population numbers in the table "Population statistic" and in the sections "Ethnicity" & "Religion" is caused by the use of various statistical methods.

=== Religion ===
Census 2021 (1+ %)
Religion	Number	Fraction
Roman Catholic Church	274	83.28%
None	51	15.5%
Total	329	

In year 2021 was 329 people by religion 274 from Roman Catholic Church, 51 from None, 2 from Ad hoc movements, 1 from Not found out and 1 from Evangelical Church.
