= Vodmat =

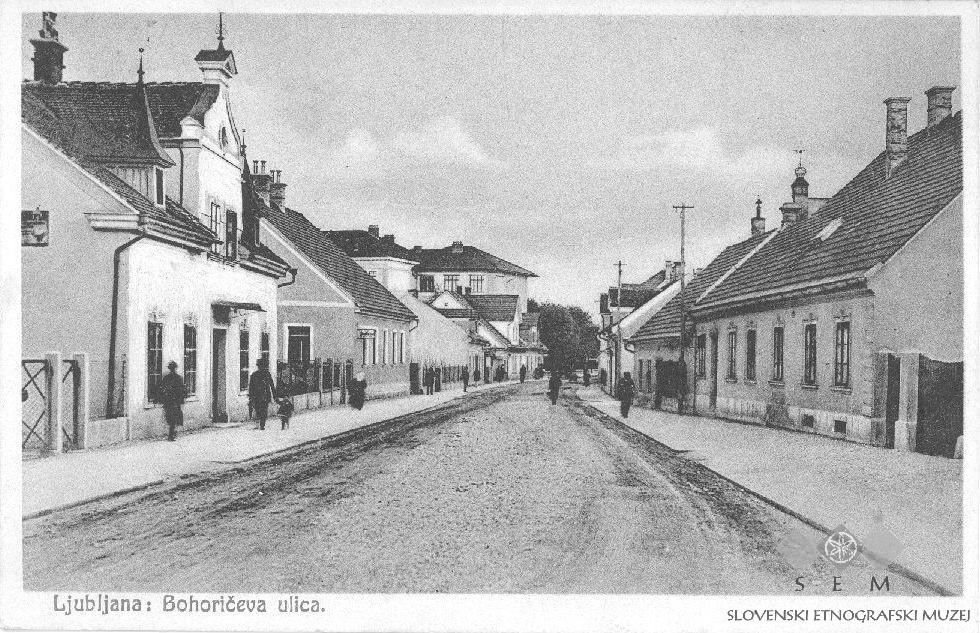
- Historical postcard of Vodmat

- Location in Slovenia
- Coordinates: 46°3′16″N 14°31′52″E
- Country: Slovenia
- Traditional region: Lower Carniola
- Statistical region: Central Slovenia
- Municipality: Ljubljana
- Elevation: 290 m (950 ft)

Vodmat (pronounced [ˈʋoːdmat]; in older sources also Udmat, German: Udmath) is a formerly independent settlement in the eastern part of the capital Ljubljana in central Slovenia. It is part of the traditional region of Lower Carniola and is now included with the rest of the municipality in the Central Slovenia Statistical Region.

== Geography ==
Vodmat lies immediately east of the historical center of Ljubljana, south of the railroad to Moste, on either side of the railroad to Lower Carniola, and extending past the Ljubljanica River to the south, into the area north of the Gruber Canal, encompassing the Kodeljevo neighborhood and Kodeljevo Castle (Slovene: Kodeljev grad, German: Thurn an der Laibach).

== Name ==
Vodmat is locally known as Udmat. The name is originally a hydronym, derived from Slavic *vodomǫtъ 'turbid, cloudy water', and probably refers to a stream that clouded the water that it emptied into. An alternate but less likely theory derives the name from the participle *odъmǫt- 'grown around'. Toponyms of the same origin include Udmat in Slovenia, and Wudmath (Slovene: Vudmat) and Admont in Austria.

== History ==
Vodmat developed from an old farming village that already existed in the Middle Ages. After the 1895 Ljubljana earthquake, Vodmat started being built up with single-story housing for workers and civil servants. Agriculture was abandoned in Vodmat by the early 20th century due to urbanization. The part of Vodmat lying west of the railroad to Lower Carniola was annexed by the City of Ljubljana in 1896. This was then known as Stari Vodmat 'old Vodmat', distinguishing it from Novi Vodmat 'new Vodmat' east of the railroad and outside the city limits. The remainder of Vodmat was annexed by the City of Ljubljana in 1935, ending its existence as an independent settlement.

== Notable people ==
Notable people that were born or lived in Vodmat include:

- Janez Cigler (1792–1867), writer
