= Moste (Ljubljana) =

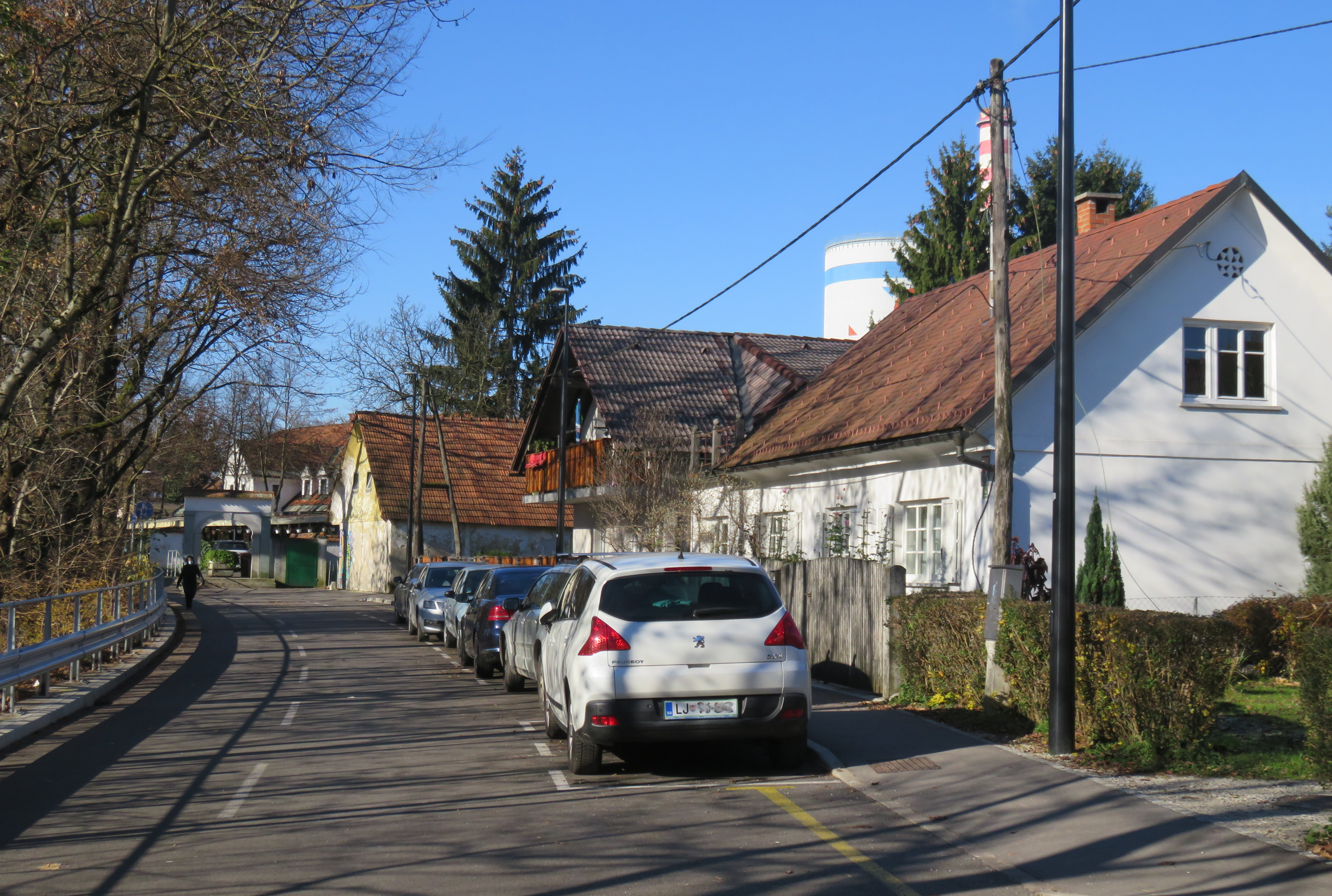
- Old village center of Moste

- Location in Slovenia
- Coordinates: 46°3′18″N 14°32′56″E
- Country: Slovenia
- Traditional region: Upper Carniola
- Statistical region: Central Slovenia
- Municipality: Ljubljana
- Elevation: 287 m (942 ft)

Moste (pronounced [ˈmoːstɛ]) is a formerly independent settlement in the east-central part of the capital Ljubljana in central Slovenia. It belongs to the City Municipality of Ljubljana. It is part of the traditional region of Upper Carniola and is now included with the rest of the municipality in the Central Slovenia Statistical Region. Ljubljana's Moste District is named after Moste.

== Geography ==
Moste is a settlement that originally stood on the left bank of the Ljubljanica River on a bend just east of the mouth of the Gruber Canal.

== Name ==
Moste was attested in historical sources as Prukke in 1324 and dorf ze Pruk in 1330, both names corresponding to the modern German word Brücke 'bridge'. The Slovene name Moste is derived from the common noun most 'bridge', referring to a settlement where there was a bridge. Today's feminine plural name was probably originally a locative masculine singular (*pri mostě 'at the bridge') that was later reanalyzed.

== History ==
Moste was attested as a village in the 14th century. Together with the entire former Municipality of Moste, Moste was annexed by Ljubljana in 1935, ending its existence as a separate settlement.

Moste had a population of a population of 506 (in 64 houses) in 1880, 552 (in 75 houses) in 1900, and 857 (in 94 houses) in 1931.

== Notable people ==
Notable people that were born or lived in Moste include:

- France Skobl (1877–1964), politician, elected mayor of Moste in 1921
- Olga Vipotnik (1923–2009), Partisan
