= Charles David Badham =

English writer, physician, entomologist, and mycologist

Charles David Badham FRCP (27 August 1805 – 14 July 1857) was an English writer, physician, entomologist, and mycologist.

== Background and education ==
Charles David Badham was the son of Charles Badham, Regius Professor of the Practice of Medicine at the University of Glasgow. His mother was Margaret Campbell, known as "the Queen of Scots" and subject of a portrait by Ingres. His younger brother, confusingly called Charles Badham, was a noted classical scholar. Adding to the confusion, another younger brother, also called Charles Badham, became vicar of All Saints Sudbury in Suffolk.

Charles David (or simply David) Badham was educated at Westminster and subsequently at Emmanuel College, Cambridge where he graduated BA in 1826. Following his father's career in medicine, he went on to Pembroke College, Oxford, receiving his MB in 1830 and MD in 1833, becoming a Fellow of the Royal College of Physicians.

== Medicine and holy orders ==
David Badham seems to have started his medical career in Scotland, where he achieved some notoriety for setting a patient's irregular heartbeat to music. In 1833, a Radcliffe travelling fellowship allowed Badham to practise medicine in France and Italy, for some of the time as personal physician to Thomas Barrett-Leonard MP. He returned to England in 1845 and, through poor health, relinquished medicine and took holy orders. Badham was appointed curate of Wymondham in Norfolk by Bishop Stanley who became his friend. Subsequently he was appointed curate of East Bergholt in Suffolk, where he remained till his death.

He married Anna Hume, daughter of James Deacon Hume, Secretary to the Board of Trade. David's brother Charles (the Sudbury one) married her sister and subsequently wrote a biography of J.D. Hume.

David Badham published a number of medical papers during his early career, but thereafter wrote widely on a range of subjects, mainly natural history, and was a regular contributor to Blackwood's Magazine and subsequently Frazer's Magazine.

== Entomology ==
Badham was an early member of the Société entomologique de France and published a pamphlet whilst in France claiming that insects lacked intelligence or senses, being governed entirely by blind instinct. He continued the same theme in a later book called Insect Life published in 1845. Contemporary reviews suggest that British entomologists thought little of his thesis.

== Mycology ==
The Rev. Dr Badham was more successful as a mycologist, writing a well-received Treatise on the esculent funguses of England, published in 1847. He seems to have become interested in the subject as a result of visiting fungus markets in Italy. Eating wild fungi was considered an eccentric and dangerous pastime in England at the time and the book attracted some popular interest, if only as a curiosity. The original edition contained colour plates by the noted mycological illustrator Anna Maria Hussey. A second (posthumous) edition was published in 1863, edited by mycologist Frederick Currey.

Badham became interested in fungi generally, as well as myxomycetes, sending unusual collections to the leading mycologist of the day, the Rev. M.J. Berkeley. The myxomycete genera Badhamia and Badhamiopsis are named after him, as are five species of fungi, including the agaric now known as Leucocoprinus badhamii.

His fungal collections are in the mycological herbarium of the Royal Botanic Gardens, Kew. Some 500 watercolours of fungi painted by his wife Anna were presented to Haslemere Museum.

== Icthyophagy ==
Badham's last major work was a compilation of articles first published in Frazer's Magazine, with the strange title Prose halieutics, or ancient and modern fish tattle. This consists of anecdotes, classical allusions, and odd facts about fish, fishing, and fish-eating — the "Author's purport" being "to treat of fish icthyophagously, not icthyologically, and to give, not fish science, but fish tattle". The original Halieutica was a classical Greek poem by Oppian on fishing. Badham's book treats everything from fish salves for hair growth to mackerels in heraldry.

== Publications ==
- Badham, D. (1834). Reflections on the nature of inflammation, and its alleged consequences. 67 pp. Glasgow: University Press
- Badham, D. (1837). The question concerning the sensibility, intelligence, and instinctive actions of insects. 54 pp. Paris: A. Belin
- Badham, D. (1839). Two cases of cerebral disease. London Medical Gazette 23: 900–904
- Badham, C.D. (1845). Insect life. 171 pp. Glasgow: W. Blackwood
- Badham, C.D. (1847). A treatise on the esculent funguses of England. 138 pp. London: Reeve Bros
- Badham, C.D. (1854). Prose halieutics, or ancient and modern fish tattle. 552 pp. London: Parker & Son
- Badham, C.D. (1857). An August at Felixstowe. 37 pp. Ipswich: J. Haddock

== See also ==
- List of mycologists
