= Dekýš =

- Municipality
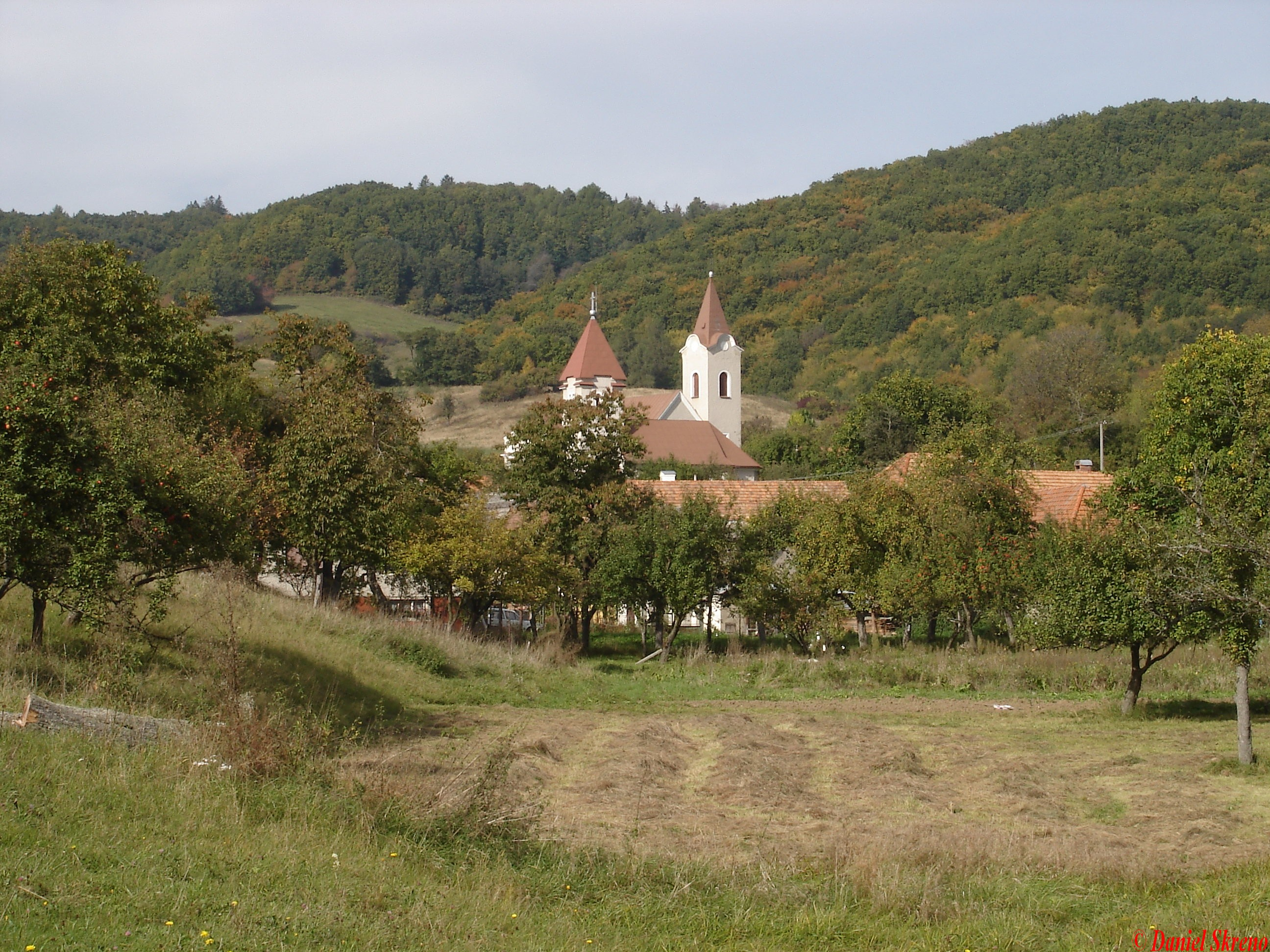

- Flag

- Location of Dekýš in the Banská Bystrica Region Location of Dekýš in Slovakia
- Coordinates: 48.40°N 18.77°E
- Country: Slovakia
- Region: Banská Bystrica Region
- District: Banská Štiavnica District
- First mentioned: 1270

Area
  - Total: 17.82 km^{2} (6.88 sq mi)
- Elevation: 471 m (1,545 ft)

Population (2025)
  - Total: 181
- Time zone: UTC+1 (CET)
  - Summer (DST): UTC+2 (CEST)
- Postal code: 969 01
- Area code: +421 45
- Vehicle registration plate (until 2022): BS
- Website: www.dekys.sk

Dekýš (1920–1927: Ďekýš) is a village and municipality in Banská Štiavnica District, in the Banská Bystrica Region of Slovakia.

== Geography ==
The municipality lies at an altitude of 471 metres (1,545 ft) and covers an area of 17.82 km^{2} (6.88 sq mi) (2025).

== History ==
Settlements from the Paleolithic period and from the Roman period have been excavated here.

In historical records, the village was first mentioned in 1270 (1270 Gukes, 1388 Gykys). In 1388 it belonged to Levice town and later on to the Mining Chamber. In 1944 men of age from 16 to 40 years were deported to Germany.

== Genealogical resources ==
The records for genealogical research are available at the state archive "Statny Archiv in Banska Bystrica, Slovakia"

- Roman Catholic church records (births/marriages/deaths): 1743-1896 (parish B)
- Lutheran church records (births/marriages/deaths): 1829-1952 (parish B)

== Population ==
Population statistic (10 years)
Year	1995	2005	2015	2025
Count	259	236	193	181
Difference		−8.88%	−18.22%	−6.21%

Population statistic
Year	2024	2025
Count	186	181
Difference		−2.68%

It has a population of 181 people (31 December 2025).

=== Ethnicity ===
Census 2021 (1+ %)
Ethnicity	Number	Fraction
Slovak	193	100%
Total	193	

In year 2021 was 193 people by ethnicity 193 as Slovak and 1 as Not found out.

Note on population: The difference values of population numbers in the table "Population statistic" and in the sections "Ethnicity" & "Religion" is caused by the use of various statistical methods.

=== Religion ===
Census 2021 (1+ %)
Religion	Number	Fraction
Roman Catholic Church	161	83.42%
None	18	9.33%
Evangelical Church	8	4.15%
Not found out	4	2.07%
Total	193	

In year 2021 was 193 people by religion 161 from Roman Catholic Church, 18 from None, 8 from Evangelical Church, 4 from Not found out, 1 from Jehovah's Witnesses and 1 from Hinduism.

== See also ==
- List of municipalities and towns in Slovakia
