= Kozelník =

Village and municipality in Banská Štiavnica, Banská Bystrica, Slovakia

Kozelník Zólyomkecskés
- Municipality
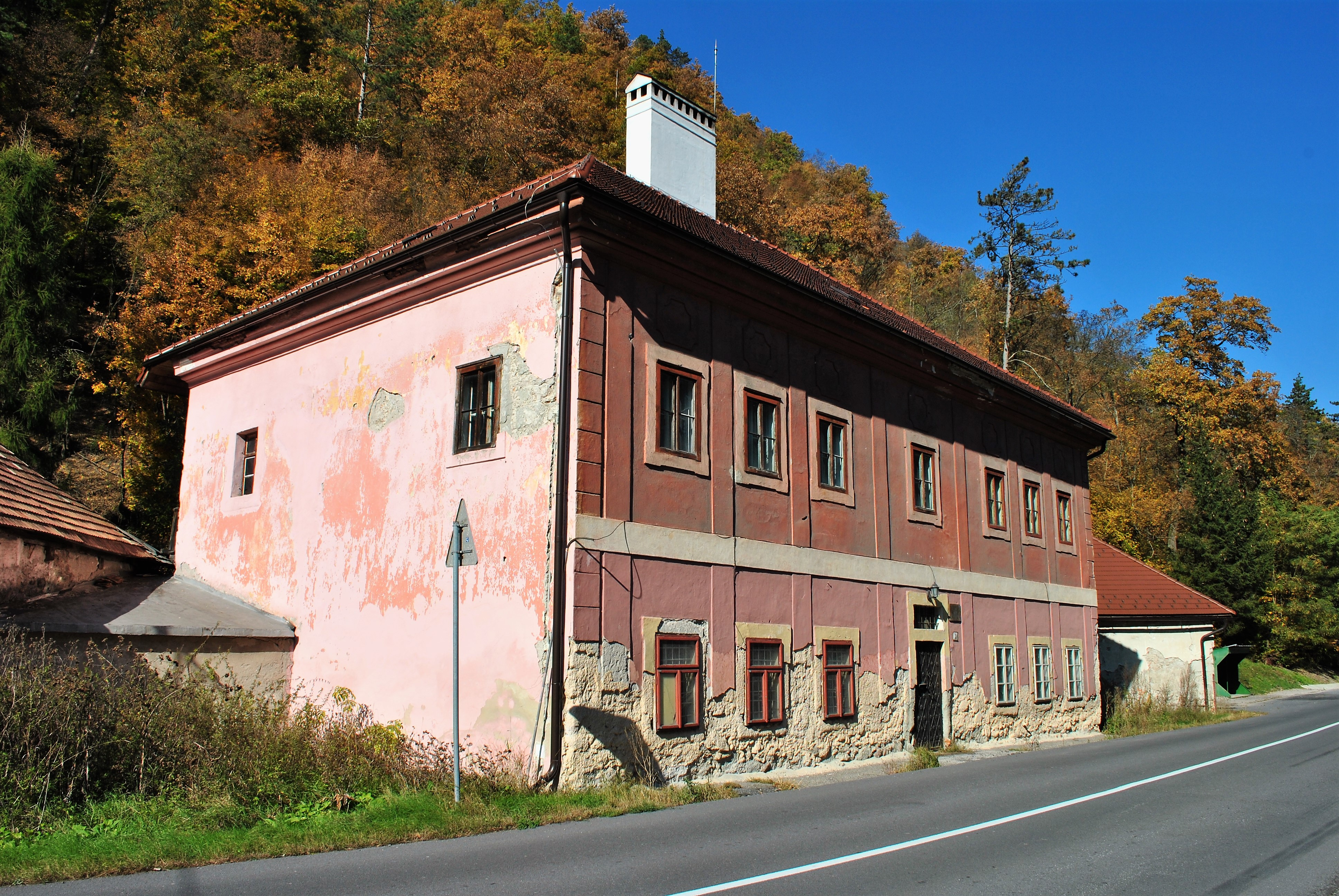
- The roadside inn in Kozelník

- Flag

- Location of Kozelník in the Banská Bystrica Region Location of Kozelník in Slovakia
- Coordinates: 48°30′44″N 18°59′51″E
- Country: Slovakia
- Region: Banská Bystrica Region
- District: Banská Štiavnica District
- First mentioned: 1424

Government
  - Mayor: Soňa Pallayová (Ind.)

Area
  - Total: 9.01 km^{2} (3.48 sq mi)
- Elevation: 379 m (1,243 ft)

Population (2025)
  - Total: 176
- Time zone: UTC+1 (CET)
  - Summer (DST): UTC+2 (CEST)
- Postal code: 966 15
- Area code: +421 45
- Vehicle registration plate (until 2022): BS
- Website: kozelnik.sk

Kozelnik (Hungarian: Zólyomkecskés) is a village and municipality in Banská Štiavnica District, in the Banská Bystrica Region of Slovakia. The first written mention of the village dates from 1518.

== Geography ==
The municipality lies at an altitude of 379 metres (1,243 ft) and covers an area of 9.01 km^{2} (3.48 sq mi) (2025).

== Population ==
Population statistic (10 years)
Year	1995	2005	2015	2025
Count	208	198	173	176
Difference		−4.80%	−12.62%	+1.73%

Population statistic
Year	2024	2025
Count	174	176
Difference		+1.14%

It has a population of 176 people (31 December 2025).

=== Ethnicity ===
Census 2021 (1+ %)
Ethnicity	Number	Fraction
Slovak	159	98.75%
Not found out	2	1.24%
Total	161	

In year 2021 was 161 people by ethnicity 159 as Slovak, 2 as Not found out and 1 as Czech.

Note on population: The difference values of population numbers in the table "Population statistic" and in the sections "Ethnicity" & "Religion" is caused by the use of various statistical methods.

=== Religion ===
Census 2021 (1+ %)
Religion	Number	Fraction
Evangelical Church	72	44.72%
Roman Catholic Church	54	33.54%
None	31	19.25%
Not found out	3	1.86%
Total	161	

In year 2021 was 161 people by religion 72 from Evangelical Church, 54 from Roman Catholic Church, 31 from None, 3 from Not found out and 1 from Jehovah's Witnesses.

== Genealogical resources ==
The records for genealogical research are available at the state archive "Statny Archiv in Banska Bystrica, Slovakia"

- Roman Catholic church records (births/marriages/deaths): 1786-1912 (parish B)
- Lutheran church records (births/marriages/deaths): 1738-1909 (parish B)

== See also ==
- List of municipalities and towns in Slovakia
