= Beluj =

Beluj Béld
- Municipality
- Flag

- Location of Beluj in the Banská Bystrica Region Location of Beluj in Slovakia
- Coordinates: 48.35°N 18.90°E
- Country: Slovakia
- Region: Banská Bystrica Region
- District: Banská Štiavnica District
- First mentioned: 1290

Area
  - Total: 22.81 km^{2} (8.81 sq mi)
- Elevation: 410 m (1,350 ft)

Population (2025)
  - Total: 134
- Time zone: UTC+1 (CET)
  - Summer (DST): UTC+2 (CEST)
- Postal code: 969 74
- Area code: +421 45
- Vehicle registration plate (until 2022): BS
- Website: obecbeluj.sk

Beluj (Hungarian: Béld) is a village and municipality in the Banská Štiavnica District, in the Banská Bystrica Region of Slovakia.

== Geography ==
The municipality lies at an altitude of 410 metres (1,350 ft) and covers an area of 22.81 km^{2} (8.81 sq mi) (2025).

== History ==
In historical records, the village was first mentioned in 1232 (Bolug) when it belonged to the Hunt family, of Sitno Castle. In 1338 it passed to the Szechényi family, in the 16th century to the Koháry family, and later on to the Coburgs.

== Genealogical resources ==
The records for genealogical research are available at the state archive "Statny Archiv in Banska Bystrica, Slovakia"

- Roman Catholic church records (births/marriages/deaths): 1720-1908 (parish B)
- Lutheran church records (births/marriages/deaths): 1836-1927 (parish A)

== Population ==
Population statistic (10 years)
Year	1995	2005	2015	2025
Count	170	154	115	134
Difference		−9.41%	−25.32%	+16.52%

Population statistic
Year	2024	2025
Count	137	134
Difference		−2.18%

It has a population of 134 people (31 December 2025).

=== Ethnicity ===
Census 2021 (1+ %)
Ethnicity	Number	Fraction
Slovak	130	94.89%
Not found out	5	3.64%
Hungarian	2	1.45%
Total	137	

In year 2021 was 137 people by ethnicity 130 as Slovak, 5 as Not found out, 2 as Hungarian, 1 as Czech, 1 as Serbian, 1 as Polish, 1 as Moravian and 1 as Bulgarian.

Note on population: The difference values of population numbers in the table "Population statistic" and in the sections "Ethnicity" & "Religion" is caused by the use of various statistical methods.

=== Religion ===
Census 2021 (1+ %)
Religion	Number	Fraction
Roman Catholic Church	69	50.36%
Evangelical Church	36	26.28%
None	25	18.25%
Not found out	5	3.65%
Total	137	

In year 2021 was 137 people by religion 69 from Roman Catholic Church, 36 from Evangelical Church, 25 from None, 5 from Not found out, 1 from Christian Congregations in Slovakia and 1 from Other.

== See also ==
- List of municipalities and towns in Slovakia
