= Andrea Badami =

American painter and native artist (1913–2002)

- Born: October 27, 1913; Omaha, Nebraska, U.S.
- Died: 2002 (aged 88–89); Tucson, Arizona, U.S.
- Occupation: Painter

Andrea Badami (1913–2002) was an American painter who became "an internationally known folk artist." His work can be seen at the Museum of Nebraska Art. He received no formal art education, since his parents considered it a waste of time.

== Life ==
Badami was born in Omaha, Nebraska to Italian parents. At the age of five his father moved the family back to Corleone and Badami lived there until the age of 15 when he moved back to Omaha where he stayed until 1931 at which point he moved back to Sicily. He married Lena Badami (no relation) in January 1939. In 1940 he was drafted into the Italian army which he served in during World War II. He was sent to Africa where he was captured by the British and was a British prisoner of war for almost six years. At the end of the war Baldami, his wife, and two children returned to Nebraska. Back in Omaha, Baldami worked from 1948 to 1978 with Union Pacific Railroad repair shop. After his retirement he moved to Tucson, Arizona.
