= Charles Badham =

English classical philologist (1813–1884)

The Reverend Charles Badham
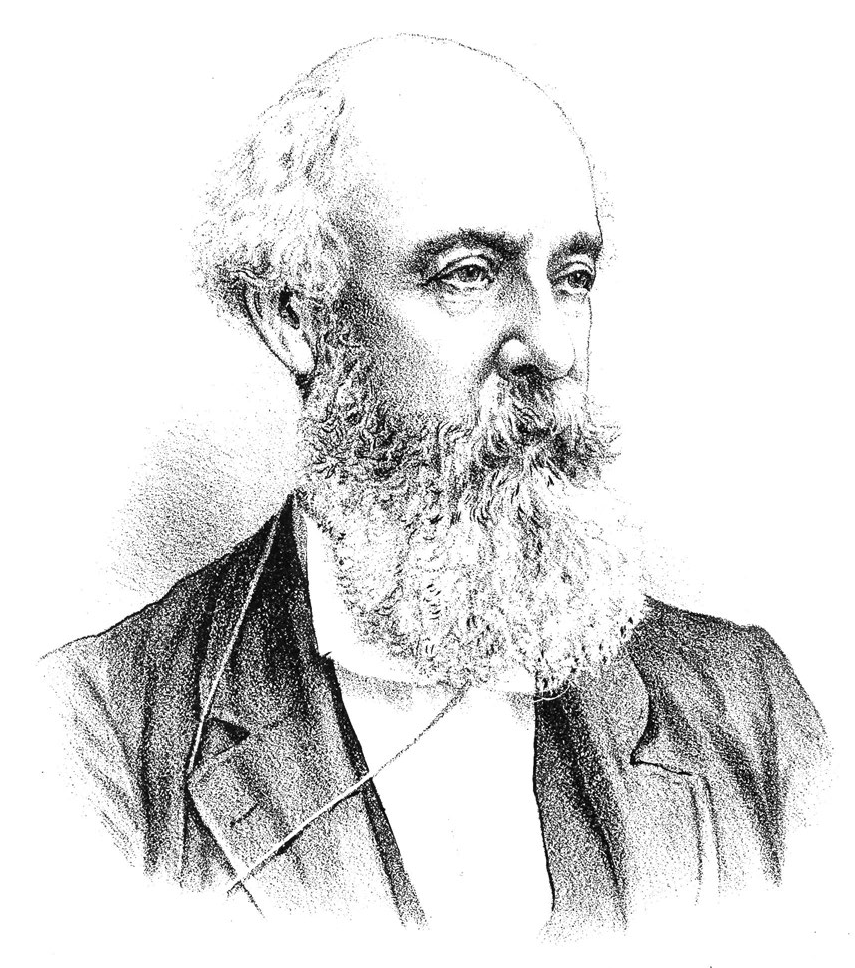
- Charles Badham headmaster, and university professor, in England and New South Wales, Australia
- Born: 18 July 1813; Ludlow, Shropshire
- Died: 27 February 1884 (aged 70)
- Occupations: Classical philologist, textual critic, headmaster, and university professor

Academic background
- Education: Eton College
- Alma mater: Wadham College, Oxford; Peterhouse, Cambridge (MA)

Academic work
- Discipline: Classics
- Institutions: University of Sydney

Reverend Charles Badham (18 July 1813 – 27 February 1884) was an English classical philologist, textual critic, headmaster, and university professor, active in England and even more so in Australia.

== Early life ==
Badham was born at Ludlow, Shropshire, the fourth son of Charles Badham senior, a classical scholar and regius professor of physic at Glasgow; and Margaret Campbell, a cousin of Thomas Campbell. His elder brother, Rev. Dr Charles David Badham, became a physician and popular writer.

From seven years of age, Badham was sent with his three brothers to Switzerland to study under Johann Pestalozzi. Badham afterwards attended Eton College from about 1826, and in 1830 was elected to a scholarship at Wadham College, Oxford, but only obtained a third class in Classics (1836), a failure which may have been due to the methods of study at Oxford. In 1837 Badham went to Italy, where he occupied himself in the study of ancient manuscripts, in particular those of the Vatican Library. Badham afterwards spent some time in Germany, and was incorporated M.A. at Peterhouse, Cambridge, in 1847.. In 1867 Badham was appointed a professor at the University of Sydney.

== Late life and legacy ==
Dr Badham's classical attainments were recognised by the most famous European critics, such as C. G. Cobet, Ludwig Preller, W. Dindorf, F. W. Schneidewin, J. A. F. Meineke, A. Ritschl and Tischendorf; and in Australia, Sir James Martin, William Forster and Sir William Macleay.

Badham published editions of Euripides, Helena and Iphigenia in Tauris (1851), Ion (1851); Plato's Philebus (1855, 1878); Laches and Eutzydemus (1865), Phaedrus (1851), Symposium (1866) and De Platonis Epistolis (1866). He also contributed to classical periodicals such as Mnemosyne. His Adhortatio ad Discipulos Academiae Sydniensis (1869) contains a number of emendations of Thucydides and other classical authors. Badham also published some critiques of Shakespeare. A collected edition of his Speeches and Lectures delivered in Australia (Sydney, 1890) contains a memoir by Thomas Butler.

His oldest daughter with his first wife, Julia Matilda (née Smith), Edith Badham, was the founder of the Sydney Church of England Girls Grammar School.
