= Gonal, Badami =

Gonal
- Village
- Location within Karnataka Location within India
- Coordinates: 15°56′09″N 075°47′18″E
- Country: India
- State: Karnataka
- District: Bagalkot district
- Taluka: Badami

Languages
  - Official: Kannada
- Time zone: UTC+5:30 (IST)

Gonal is a village in the southern state of Karnataka, India. Administratively, Gonal is under Mangalore gram panchayat, Badami Taluka of Bagalkot District in Karnataka. The village of Gonal is 6 km by road west of the village of Pattadakal and 17 km by road northeast of the town of Badami.
