= Badan Warisan Malaysia =

Heritage building conservation charity in Malaysia

Coordinates: 3.1505°N 101.7145013°E

Badan Warisan Malaysia Malaysian Heritage Trust

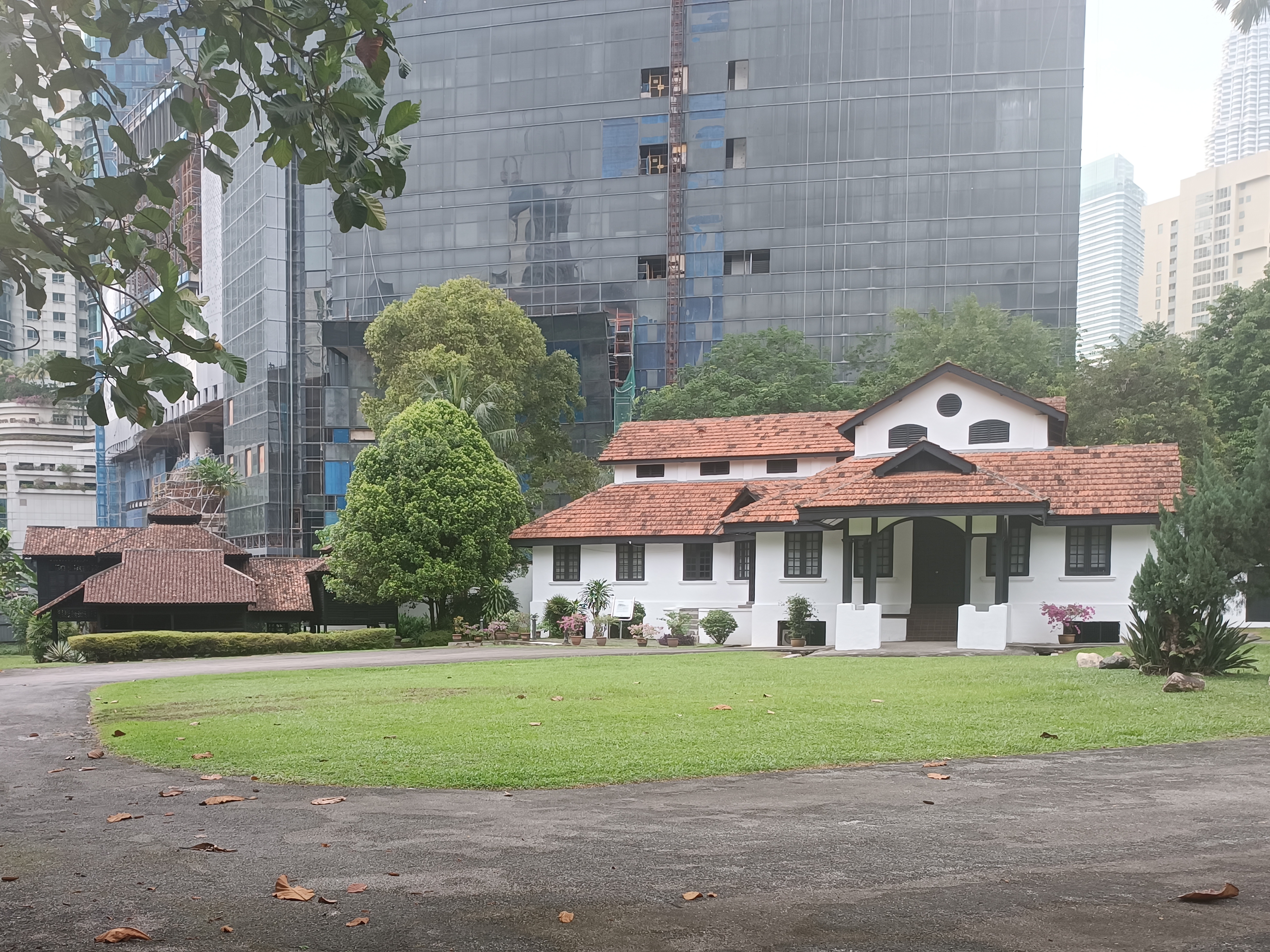
- Badan Warisan Malaysia at No. 2 Jalan Stonor, Kuala Lumpur
- Formation: 1983
- Headquarters: 2 Jalan Stonor, 50450 Kuala Lumpur
- Location: Malaysia
- Members: Voluntary
- President: Esme Lim Wei-Ling
- Vice President: Dato’ Zahim Albakri
- Honorary Secretary: YM Tengku Nasariah Tengku Syed Ibrahim
- Honorary Treasurer: Robert Morris
- Website: badanwarisanmalaysia.org

Badan Warisan Malaysia (The Heritage of Malaysia Trust) 198301009532 (104789-A) is a non-government organisation formed in 1983, concerned with the conservation and preservation of Malaysia's built heritage. It is a voluntary organisation with tax-exempt status.

Since its founding in 1983, Badan Warisan Malaysia have been involved in building conservation projects throughout Malaysia including Suffolk House in Penang, Stadium Merdeka, Gedung Raja Abdullah and Masjid DiRaja Sultan Suleiman in Klang, Bangunan Sulaiman and Rumah Penghulu Abu Seman in Kuala Lumpur, No. 8 Heeren Street in Melaka's UNESCO World Heritage Site, Rumah Kutai in Kuala Kangsar, Istana Tunku Long in Kuala Terengganu and Istana Jahar in Kota Bahru.

The Operations Team for Badan Warisan Malaysia is located at No.2, Jalan Stonor in Kuala Lumpur, in a colonial bungalow which was restored and adapted in 1995 as a Heritage Centre with exhibition, seminar, and meeting facilities.

Also located at No. 2 Jalan Stonor is the Chen Voon Fee Resource Centre (CVFRC). This is a closed-access specialised library and information centre which houses a collection of documents, books, periodicals, articles, measured drawings, slides, newspaper cuttings and photographs covering a range of topics from architecture, heritage sites, history and culture and legislation related to heritage in Malaysia and the region. The CVFRC is open to the public and supported by the Chen Voon Fee Trust.

Badan Warisan Malaysia 2025 Council consists of President: Esme Lim Wei-Ling, Vice President: Dato’ Zahim Albakri, Honorary Secretary: Tengku Nasariah Tengku Syed Ibrahim, Honorary Treasurer: Robert Morris, and Council Members; Ar. Anand Krishnan, Caesar Loong, Habsah Abang Saufi, Datuk Ismail Ibrahim, Johan Abdul Razak, TPr. Haji Nazri Md Noordin and Datin TPr. Noraida Saludin. Honorary Council Members; Karen Abraham, Katy Karpfinger.
