= Baďan =

Baďan Bagyan
- Municipality
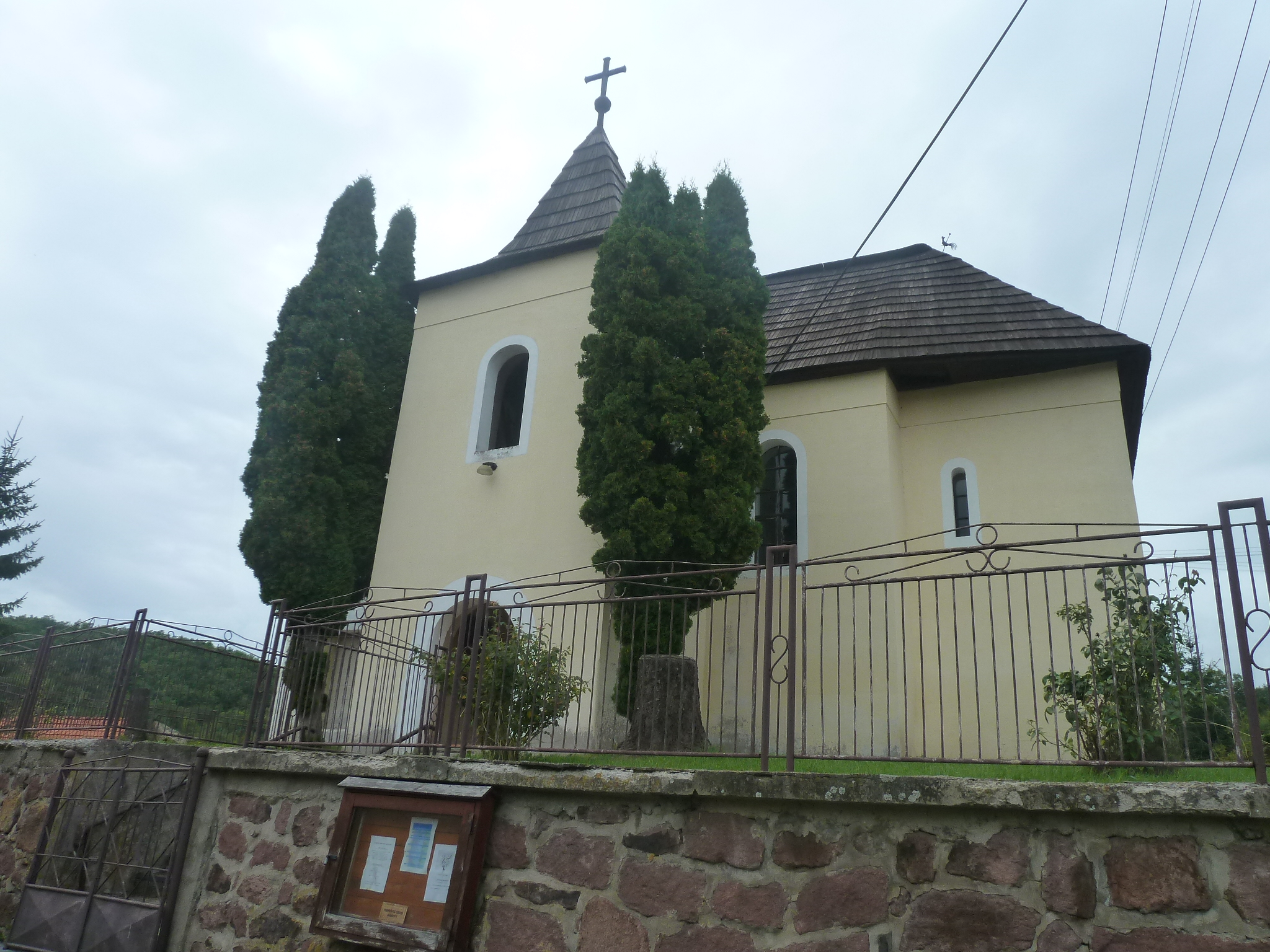
- Church in Baďan

- Flag

- Location of Baďan in the Banská Bystrica Region Location of Baďan in Slovakia
- Coordinates: 48.33°N 18.84°E
- Country: Slovakia
- Region: Banská Bystrica Region
- District: Banská Štiavnica District
- First mentioned: 1262

Government
  - Mayor: Ľubica Kuková (SMER-SD, HLAS-SD, SNS)

Area
  - Total: 15.10 km^{2} (5.83 sq mi)
- Elevation: 401 m (1,316 ft)

Population (2025)
  - Total: 147
- Time zone: UTC+1 (CET)
  - Summer (DST): UTC+2 (CEST)
- Postal code: 969 75
- Area code: +421 45
- Vehicle registration plate (until 2022): BS
- Website: www.badan.sk

Baďan (earlier also Baďany; Hungarian: Bagyan) is a village and municipality in the Banská Štiavnica District, in the Banská Bystrica Region of Slovakia.

== Geography ==
The municipality lies at an altitude of 401 metres (1,316 ft) and covers an area of 15.10 km^{2} (5.83 sq mi) (2025).

== History ==
In historical records, the village was first mentioned in 1262. Originally it belonged to the Archbishopric of Esztergom, however King Béla IV gave the village to Bzovík Castle.

== Genealogical resources ==
The records for genealogical research are available at the state archive in Banská Bystrica (Slovak: Štátny archív v Banskej Bystrici).

- Roman Catholic church records (births/marriages/deaths): 1720-1908
- Lutheran church records (births/marriages/deaths): 1829-1937 (parish A)
- Census records 1869 of Badan are not available at the state archive.

== Population ==
Population statistic (10 years)
Year	1995	2005	2015	2025
Count	231	220	195	147
Difference		−4.76%	−11.36%	−24.61%

Population statistic
Year	2024	2025
Count	148	147
Difference		−0.67%

It has a population of 147 people (31 December 2025).

=== Ethnicity ===
Census 2021 (1+ %)
Ethnicity	Number	Fraction
Slovak	127	76.04%
Romani	35	20.95%
Not found out	5	2.99%
Total	167	

In year 2021 was 167 people by ethnicity 127 as Slovak, 35 as Romani and 5 as Not found out.

Note on population: The difference values of population numbers in the table "Population statistic" and in the sections "Ethnicity" & "Religion" is caused by the use of various statistical methods.

=== Religion ===
Census 2021 (1+ %)
Religion	Number	Fraction
Evangelical Church	67	40.12%
Roman Catholic Church	49	29.34%
None	46	27.54%
Not found out	5	2.99%
Total	167	

In year 2021 was 167 people by religion 67 from Evangelical Church, 49 from Roman Catholic Church, 46 from None and 5 from Not found out.

== See also ==
- List of municipalities and towns in Slovakia
