= Selo (Ljubljana) =

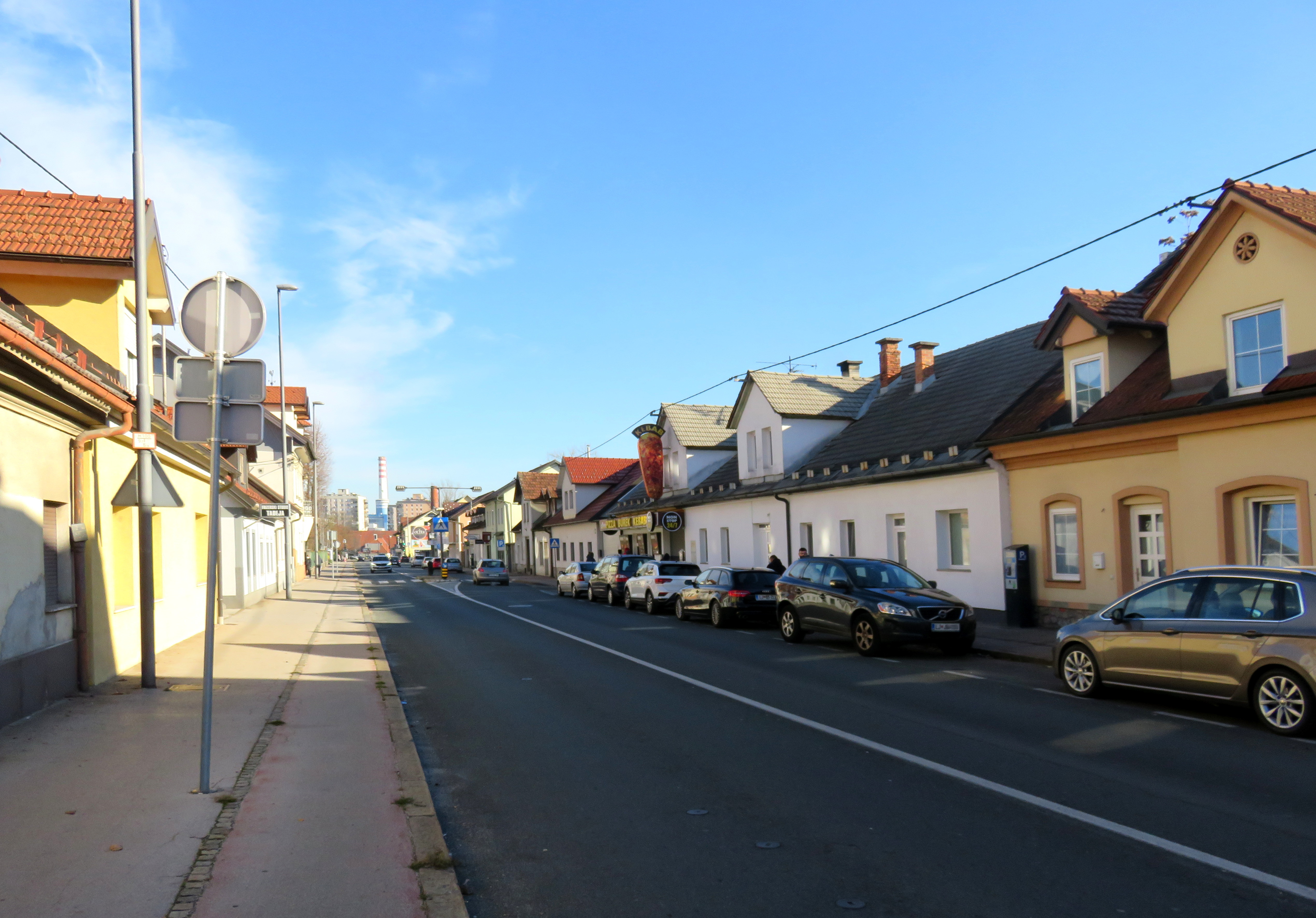

- Location in Slovenia
- Coordinates: 46°3′23″N 14°32′10″E
- Country: Slovenia
- Traditional region: Upper Carniola
- Statistical region: Central Slovenia
- Municipality: Ljubljana
- Elevation: 289 m (948 ft)

Selo (pronounced [ˈsɛːlɔ]) is a formerly independent settlement in the east-central part of the capital Ljubljana in central Slovenia. It belongs to the City Municipality of Ljubljana. It is part of the traditional region of Upper Carniola and is now included with the rest of the municipality in the Central Slovenia Statistical Region.

== Geography ==
Selo stands on the left bank of the Ljubljanica River on a slight bend just west of the mouth of the Gruber Canal, at the site of the former sharp bend where the river's course was straightened in 1835.

== Name ==
In older sources, the village was referred to as Sello an der Fabri(c)k (literally, 'Selo by the factory'), referring to a cloth factory established opposite Selo Mansion in the first half of the 18th century. The name Selo is common in Slovenia and is derived from the common noun selo 'settlement, village'.

== History ==
Selo was attested as a village in the 14th century. Selo Mansion was built in Selo in 1760 and initially served as a Jesuit College retreat from Trieste. Together with the entire former Municipality of Moste, Selo was annexed by Ljubljana in 1935, ending its existence as a separate settlement.

Selo had a population of a population of 149 (in 13 houses) in 1880, 253 (in 17 houses) in 1900, and 2,108 (in 102 houses) in 1931.

== Notable people ==
Notable people that were born or lived in Selo include:

- Andreas Meschutar (1791–1865), priest and administrative official
