= Badam-e Dan =

Badam-e Dan بادام دان
- Village
- Location within Iran
- Coordinates: 28°50′20″N 57°56′21″E
- Country: Iran
- Province: Kerman
- County: Jiroft
- Bakhsh: Jebalbarez
- Rural District: Maskun

Population (2006)
  - Total: 68
- Time zone: UTC+3:30 (IRST)
  - Summer (DST): UTC+4:30 (IRDT)

Badam-e Dan (Persian: بادام دان, also Romanized as Bādām-e Dān; also known as Bādām-e ‘Olyā) is a village in Maskun Rural District, Jebalbarez District, Jiroft County, Kerman Province, Iran. At the 2006 census, its population was 68, in 10 families.
