= Charles Badham (physician) =

English doctor

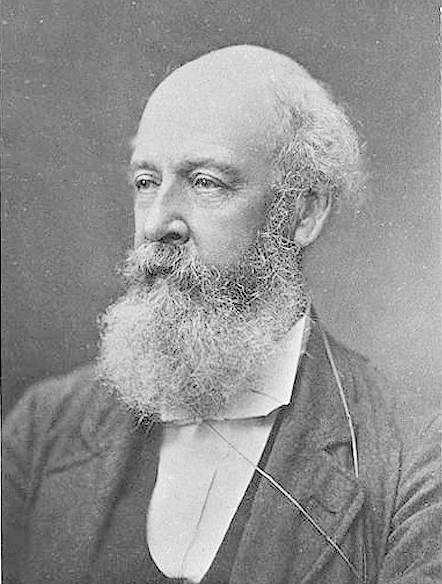
Charles Badham

Charles Badham FRS (17 April 1780 – 10 November 1845) was a physician from London, England, who gave bronchitis its name.

He was awarded MD in 1802 by Edinburgh University. He then entered Pembroke College, Oxford. AB (1811), AM (1812), MB (1817), MD (1817) He coined the term for the pulmonary disease bronchitis even before the time of René Laennec, a French physician. He was the first to differentiate bronchitis from pleurisy and pneumonia through the essays he wrote in 1808 and 1814.

He was a physician to the Duke of Sussex during his time and in 1827 was appointed Regius Professor of the Practice of Medicine at the University of Glasgow in Scotland.

Badham was also a translator, a classical scholar, and a devoted traveller. He produced a translation of the Satires of Juvenal in 1818. he was elected a Fellow of the Royal Society the same year.

His son, Rev. Dr Charles David Badham became a physician and writer, whilst a younger son, Rev. Prof. Charles Badham became a classical scholar and Australian academic.
