= Banský Studenec =

Village and municipality in Slovakia

Banský Studenec Tópatak
- Municipality
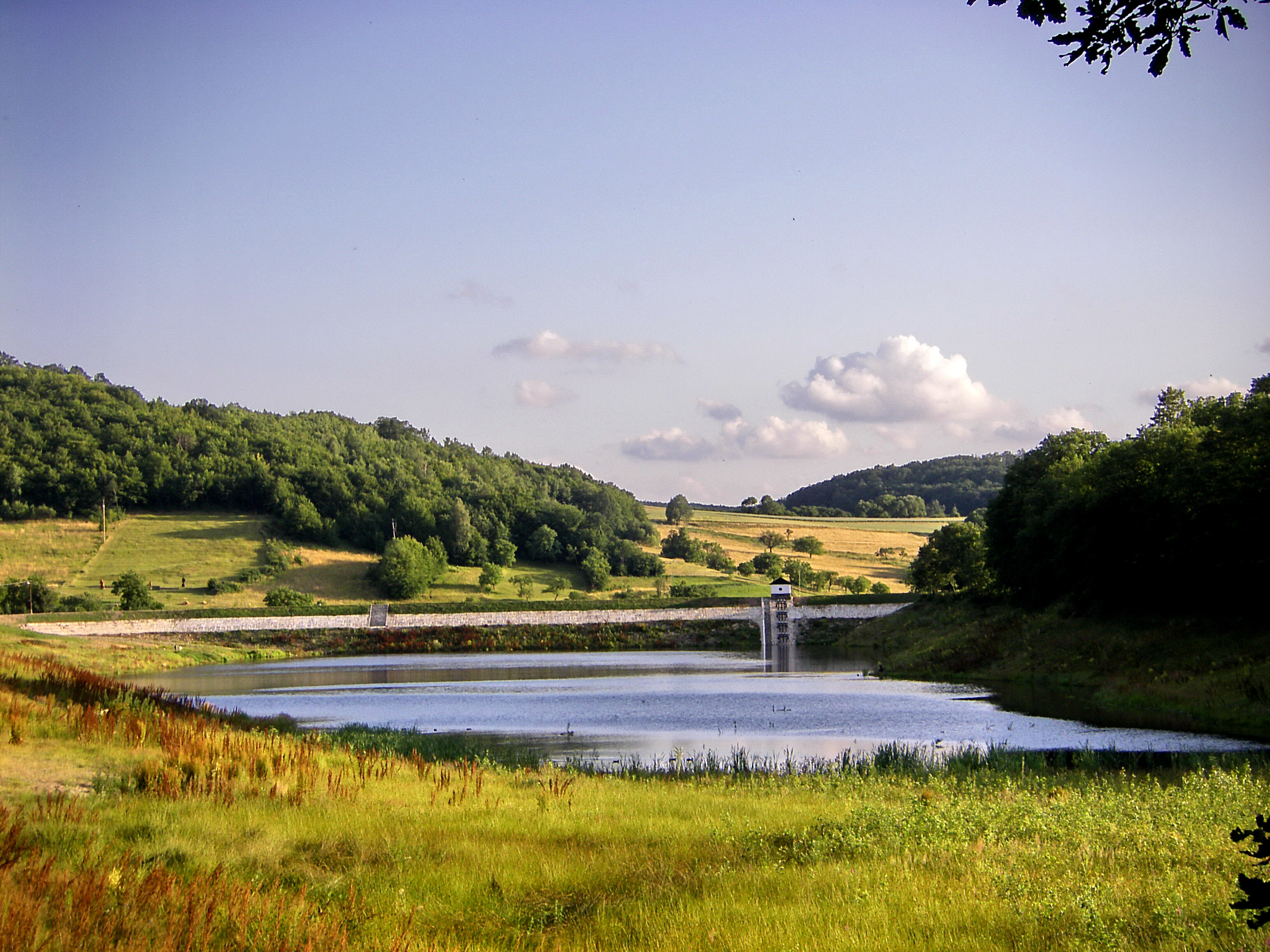

- Flag

- Location of Banský Studenec in the Banská Bystrica Region Location of Banský Studenec in Slovakia
- Coordinates: 48.45°N 18.98°E
- Country: Slovakia
- Region: Banská Bystrica Region
- District: Banská Štiavnica District
- First mentioned: 1266

Area
  - Total: 19.19 km^{2} (7.41 sq mi)
- Elevation: 570 m (1,870 ft)

Population (2025)
  - Total: 458
- Time zone: UTC+1 (CET)
  - Summer (DST): UTC+2 (CEST)
- Postal code: 969 01
- Area code: +421 45
- Vehicle registration plate (until 2022): BS
- Website: www.banskystudenec.sk

Banský Studenec (German: Kohlbach, Goldbach; Hungarian: Tópatak) is a village and municipality in the Banská Štiavnica District, in the Banská Bystrica Region of Slovakia.

== Geography ==
The municipality lies at an altitude of 570 metres (1,870 ft) and covers an area of 19.19 km^{2} (7.41 sq mi) (2025).

== History ==
In historical records, the village was first mentioned in 1266 (Kulpach) as a German settlement. It belonged to Banská Bystrica.

== Genealogical resources ==
The records for genealogical research are available at the state archive in Banská Bystrica (Slovak: Štátny archív v Banskej Bystrici).

- Roman Catholic church records (births/marriages/deaths): 1788-1897 (parish A)

== Population ==
Population statistic (10 years)
Year	1995	2005	2015	2025
Count	453	465	457	458
Difference		+2.64%	−1.72%	+0.21%

Population statistic
Year	2024	2025
Count	461	458
Difference		−0.65%

It has a population of 458 people (31 December 2025).

=== Ethnicity ===
Census 2021 (1+ %)
Ethnicity	Number	Fraction
Slovak	455	98.27%
Not found out	10	2.15%
Romani	5	1.07%
Total	463	

In year 2021 was 463 people by ethnicity 455 as Slovak, 10 as Not found out, 5 as Romani, 3 as Other, 2 as Czech, 1 as Rusyn and 1 as Russian.

Note on population: The difference values of population numbers in the table "Population statistic" and in the sections "Ethnicity" & "Religion" is caused by the use of various statistical methods.

=== Religion ===
Census 2021 (1+ %)
Religion	Number	Fraction
Roman Catholic Church	324	69.98%
None	94	20.3%
Other and not ascertained christian church	14	3.02%
Not found out	13	2.81%
Greek Catholic Church	7	1.51%
Total	463	

In year 2021 was 463 people by religion 324 from Roman Catholic Church, 94 from None, 14 from Other and not ascertained christian church, 13 from Not found out, 7 from Greek Catholic Church, 3 from Eastern Orthodox Church, 3 from Ad hoc movements, 2 from Evangelical Church, 1 from Other, 1 from Seventh-day Adventist Church and 1 from Baptists Church.

== See also ==
- List of municipalities and towns in Slovakia
