= Badhamiopsis =

Scientific classification
- Domain: Eukaryota
- Clade: Amorphea
- Phylum: Amoebozoa
- Class: Myxogastria
- Order: Physarales
- Family: Physaraceae
- Genus: Badhamiopsis; T.E.Brooks & H.W.Keller

Genus of fungi

Badhamiopsis is a genus of fungi belonging to the family Physaraceae.

The species of this genus are found in Europe and America.

Species:

- Badhamiopsis ainoae (Yamash.) T.E.Brooks & H.W.Keller, 1976
- Badhamiopsis cavifera Nann.-Bremek. & Y.Yamam., 1988
- Badhamiopsis nucleata H.Z.Li, 1989
