= Lepidochrysops badhami =

Conservation status
- Least Concern (IUCN 3.1)

Scientific classification
- Kingdom: Animalia
- Phylum: Arthropoda
- Class: Insecta
- Order: Lepidoptera
- Family: Lycaenidae
- Genus: Lepidochrysops
- Species: L. badhami

Binomial name
- Lepidochrysops badhami van Son, 1956

Species of butterfly

Lepidochrysops badhami, the Badham's blue, is a species of butterfly in the family Lycaenidae. It is endemic to South Africa, where it is found in Succulent Karoo to the east of Springbok in the Northern Cape. The wingspan is 28–32 millimetres (1.1–1.3 in) for males and 29–32 mm (1.1–1.3 in) for females. Adults are on wing from September to October. There is one generation per year. The larvae feed on Pelargonium dasyphyllum.
