= Badhan =

Badhan may refer to:

- Badhan, Sanaag, a town in Somalia
- al-Badhan, a Palestinian village in the West Bank
- Badhan (organization), a blood donation organization in Bangladesh
- Badhan (Persian governor), governor of Yemen during the time of the Prophet Mohammed
- An alternative spelling for badchen, a type of Jewish entertainer

== See also ==
- Badan (disambiguation)
- Badham
