= Badami Oil Field =

Oil field in the Alaska North Slope

Badami oil field
- Badami oil field's location in Alaska
- Country: United States
- Region: Alaska North Slope
- Offshore/onshore: Offshore and onshore
- Coordinates: 70.1511°N 147.0967°W
- Operator: Savant Alaska LLC

Field history
- Discovery: Conoco Badami 1 well, March 7, 1990
- Start of production: 1998

Production
- Producing formations: Canning Formation

The Badami oil field is an oil field in the Alaska North Slope. The field is about 35 miles (56 km) east of Prudhoe Bay and about 30 miles (48 km) west of the western border of the Arctic National Wildlife Refuge 1002 Area. Badami was discovered by Conoco in 1990 at the Badami Number 1 well. The Badami pipeline was constructed to connect the field with the Trans-Alaska Pipeline System, more than 30 miles (48 km) away. The oil field is described as a complex and discontinuous reservoir containing heavy weight oil gravity ranging from 21 to 30 degrees API. Initial cost of development was approximately $300 million.

BPXA began production in 1998, but production was suspended in August 2003. BP cited the field's poor performance producing only 1,350 bbl/d (215 m^{3}/d) saying it was not sufficient to offset costs. Production resumed in September 2005 on 6 month production and 6 month recharge cycles using technique's BP developed specifically for Badami.

== Landing strip ==
Badami has a 5,100 ft (1,600 m) x 75 ft (23 m) landing strip located at the oil field near the Badami Central Processing Unit. There is also a dock along the shoreline nearby.

- Resources for this airport:
  - FAA airport information for AK78
  - AirNav airport information for AK78
  - FlightAware airport information and live flight tracker
  - SkyVector aeronautical chart for AK78

== Savant takeover ==
In 2010 due to poor oil production and reservoir complications BP sold the field to Savant Alaska LLC, a Denver-based private company. Miller Energy Resources, Inc. acquired Savant Alaska in February 2015.

== See also ==
- Prudhoe Bay oil field
- Trans-Alaska Pipeline System
