= Selo Mansion =

Mansion in Ljubljana, Slovenia

Coordinates: 46°3′24″N 14°32′16.38″E

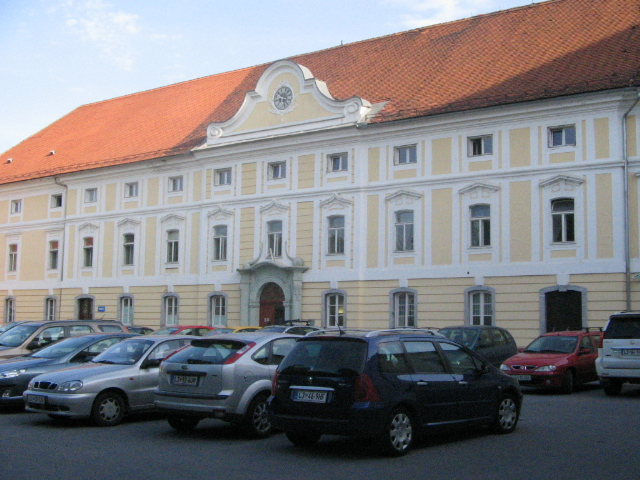
Selo Mansion

Selo Mansion (Slovene: Dvorec Selo) is a mansion at Zalog Street (Zaloška cesta) west of the intersection with Kajuh Street (Kajuhova ulica) in the former village of Selo in the Moste District of Ljubljana, the capital of Slovenia. It is a Late Baroque mansion, currently owned by the company GIVO Real. It houses the embassies of Albania and Kosovo, a private clinic, and an ethno club.

== History ==
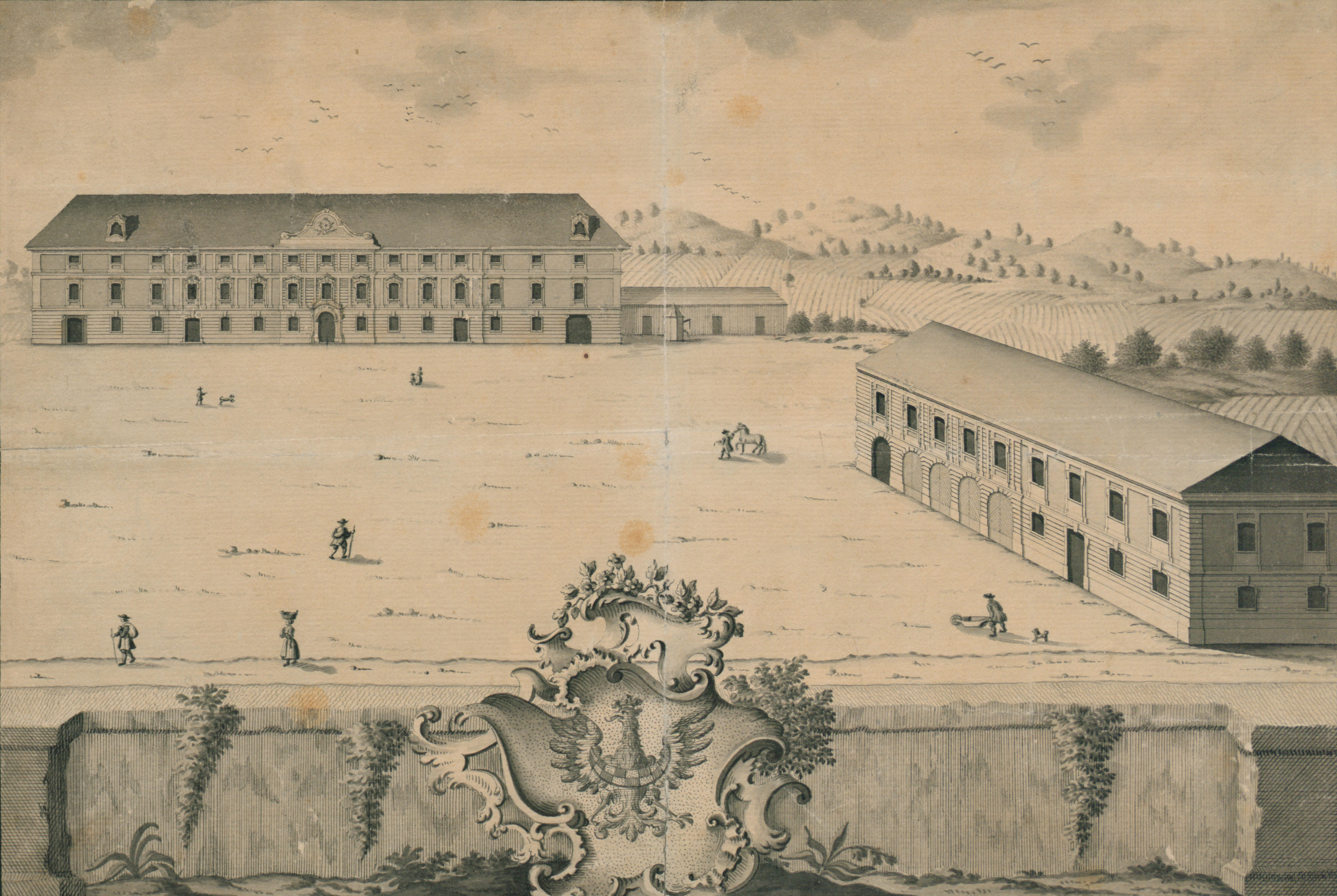
Mansion in 1762

The mansion was built in 1760 and initially served as Jesuit College retreat from Trieste. In 1762, it was bought by the tradesmen Valentin Ruard and Josef Desselbrunner, who arranged the largest cloth factory of the Austrian Empire in it. After the factory became unprofitable, it was closed in 1803. From 1820 until the end of Yugoslavia, it was used by the military. In 1994 the building was declared a historical monument of Slovenia.

== Architecture ==
The mansion profoundly exemplifies the late Baroque influence evident on many stately homes and public buildings in Slovenia. The main entrance has a stone door casing with a spiral-shaped pediment.
