= Badam, Kerman =

Badam بادام
- Village
- Location within Iran
- Coordinates: 28°50′08″N 57°55′52″E
- Country: Iran
- Province: Kerman
- County: Jiroft
- Bakhsh: Jebalbarez
- Rural District: Saghder

Population (2006)
  - Total: 292
- Time zone: UTC+3:30 (IRST)
  - Summer (DST): UTC+4:30 (IRDT)

Badam (Persian: بادام, also Romanized as Bādām) is a village in Saghder Rural District, Jebalbarez District, Jiroft County, Kerman Province, Iran. At the 2006 census, its population was 292, in 66 families.
