= Studenec (Ljubljana) =

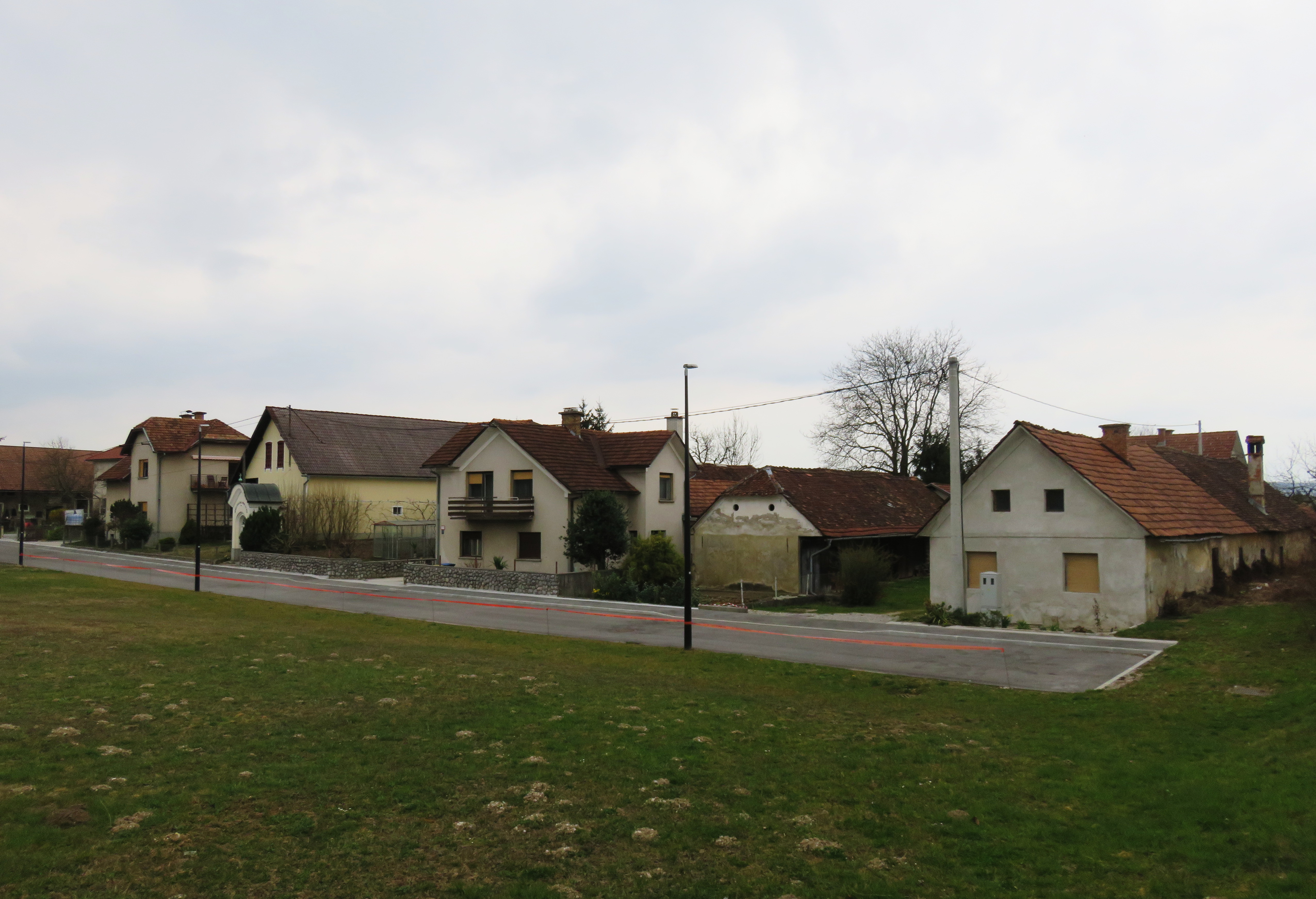

- Location in Slovenia
- Coordinates: 46°3′20.95″N 14°34′5.58″E
- Country: Slovenia
- Traditional region: Upper Carniola
- Statistical region: Central Slovenia
- Municipality: Ljubljana
- Elevation: 283 m (928 ft)

Studenec (pronounced [stuˈdɛːnəts]; German: Studenz, in older sources Kaltenbrunn) is a formerly independent settlement in the southeast part of the capital Ljubljana in central Slovenia. It belongs to the City Municipality of Ljubljana. It is part of the traditional region of Upper Carniola and is now included with the rest of the municipality in the Central Slovenia Statistical Region.

== Geography ==
Studenec is a settlement that extends along a terrace north of the Ljubljanica River. The soil is gravelly. The houses extend along the road from Ljubljana to Zalog and onto the bank below the road toward the Ljubljanica.

== Name ==
In the local dialect, Studenec is known as Stədi̯ḁ̀nc. The name is derived from the Slovene common noun studenec 'small spring', referring to a local geological feature. In this case, the name derives from a spring located along the road in the settlement. In the past the German name was Studenz.

== History ==
During the construction of the Austrian Southern Railway, Urnfield culture artifacts were discovered in Studenec, testifying to early settlement of the area. In the first half of the 16th century, a district council with six halls belonging to the lesser nobility stood in Studenec. In 1875, at the initiative of the physician Karel Bleiweis (1834–1909), the Carniolan Assembly purchased the Krisper Menagerie (Slovene: Krisperjev zverinjak, German: Thiergarten) in the southern part of Studenec in order to build a psychiatric hospital. Construction began in 1881, and in 1887 two additional three-story buildings were added to the complex. On 12 September 1933 a passenger airplane crashed in Studenec with the loss of eight lives; the event is commemorated with a plaque. Studenec was annexed by the city of Ljubljana in 1982, ending its existence as an independent settlement.

== Notable people ==
Notable people that were born or lived in Studenec include:

- Viktor Kocijančič (1901–1944), physician and journalist
