= Nicov =

- Municipality
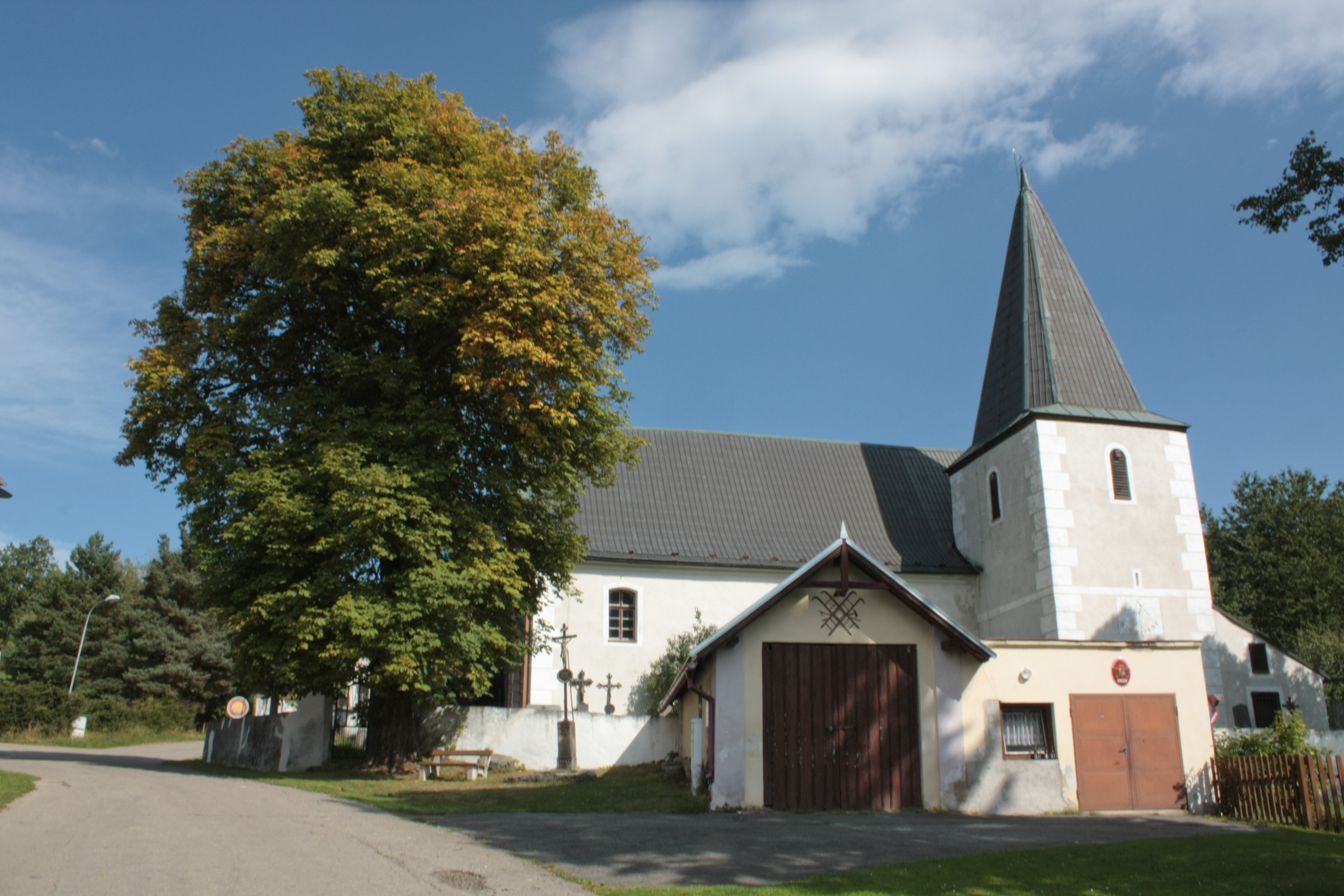
- Church of Saint Martin

- Location in the Czech Republic
- Coordinates: 49°7′32″N 13°37′14″E
- Country: Czech Republic
- Region: South Bohemian
- District: Prachatice
- First mentioned: 1295

Area
  - Total: 13.77 km^{2} (5.32 sq mi)
- Elevation: 896 m (2,940 ft)

Population (2026-01-01)
  - Total: 85
  - Density: 6.2/km^{2} (16/sq mi)
- Time zone: UTC+1 (CET)
  - Summer (DST): UTC+2 (CEST)
- Postal code: 384 73
- Website: www.nicov.cz

Nicov (German: Nitzau) is a municipality and village in Prachatice District in the South Bohemian Region of the Czech Republic. It has about 90 inhabitants.

Nicov lies approximately 31 kilometres (19 mi) north-west of Prachatice, 65 km (40 mi) west of České Budějovice, and 123 km (76 mi) south-west of Prague.

== Administrative division ==
Nicov consists of four municipal parts (in brackets population according to the 2021 census):

- Nicov (65)
- Popelná (4)
- Řetenice (13)
- Studenec (2)

== Demographics ==
Historical population
Year	Pop.	±%
1869	664	—
1880	631	−5.0%
1890	702	+11.3%
1900	659	−6.1%
1910	672	+2.0%
1921	673	+0.1%
1930	687	+2.1%
1950	188	−72.6%
1961	184	−2.1%
1970	175	−4.9%
1980	126	−28.0%
1991	99	−21.4%
2001	92	−7.1%
2011	79	−14.1%
2021	84	+6.3%
Source: Censuses
