= Parthiban Kanavu (disambiguation) =

Parthiban Kanavu (transl. Parthiban's Dream) is 1942 Tamil-language novel by Indian writer Kalki Krishnamurthy.

Parthiban Kanavu may also refer to these Indian Tamil-language films:

- Parthiban Kanavu (1960 film), adaptation of the novel by D. Yoganand
- Parthiban Kanavu (2003 film)
