= Battle of Vatapi =

642 battle

- Part of Chalukya–Pallava Wars
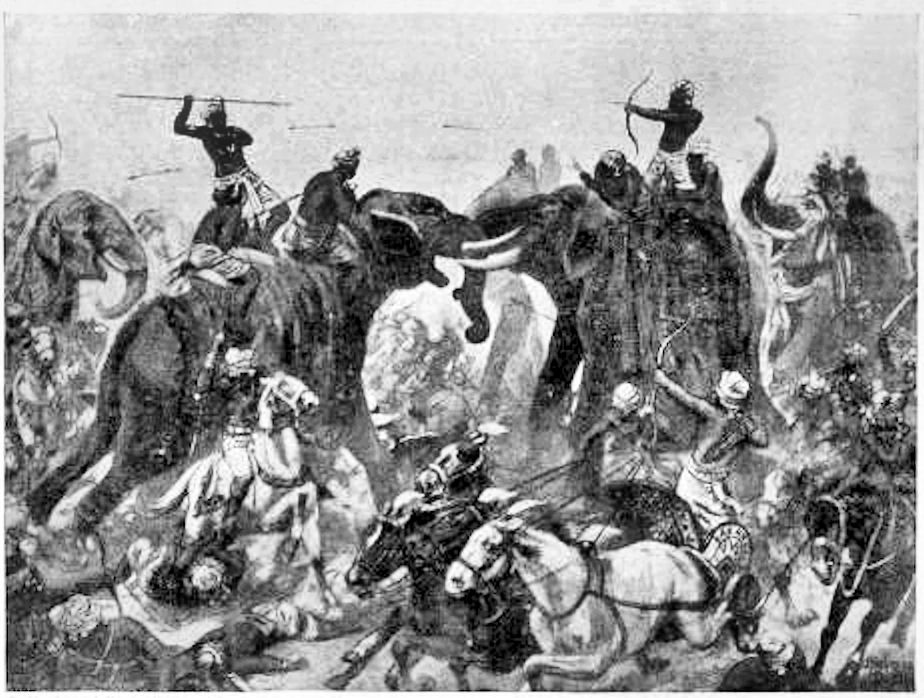
- Image depicting the Battle of Vatapi (Badami)
Date	642
Location	Vatapi
Result	Pallava victory

Belligerents
Chalukya Empire	Pallava kingdom

Commanders and leaders
Pulakeshin II †	Narasimhavarman I Paranjothi; Manavarman

Strength
Unknown	Unknown

The Battle of Vatapi was a decisive engagement which took place between the Pallavas and Chalukyas near the Chalukya capital of Vatapi (present day Badami) in 642. The battle resulted in the defeat of the Chalukya king Pulakeshin II in 642 CE and the commencement of Pallava occupation of Vatapi lasted until 654.

== Causes ==
In about 630, Pulakeshin II invaded the Pallava kingdom defeating the king Mahendravarman I and proceeded as far south as the Cauvery River on the northern frontier of the Chola Kingdom. The Pallavas long wished to avenge the humiliation suffered at the hands of Pulakeshin II and over the next few years, strengthened their forces in preparation for a counter-attack.

In 630, Mahendravarman I was succeeded by his son Narasimhavarman I under whom the Pallava kingdom emerged as a powerful state. This prompted Pulakeshin II to lead a second expedition into the Pallava Kingdom. According to K. A. Nilakanta Sastri, Pulakeshin II first defeated the Banas, who were feudatories of the Pallavas, before advancing into the Pallava Kingdom. Narasimhavarman I met the Chalukyas and defeated them in three separate encounters in Pariyala, Suramana and Manimangala, all close to the Pallava capital Kanchi, forcing them to retreat. The Pallavas, then, took the offensive and pursued the fleeing Chalukya forces deep into their territory.

== Events ==
In 642, a formidable Pallava force under Paranjothi was sent by Narasimhavarman I to capture Vatapi, the capital of the Chalukyas. Pulakeshin II met the Pallavas on the outskirts of his capital and is presumed to have lost his life in the ensuing battle. The Pallavas achieved a decisive victory over Pulakeshin II. The victorious Pallavas then took the capital and ruled it for 12 years (642-654).

The Kuram plates of Paramesvaravarman I describe the battle thus

Narasimhavarman... who wrote the syllables of (the word) vijaya, as on a plate, on Pulikesin's back, which was caused to be visible in the battles of Pariyala, Manmangala, Suramara, etc., and who destroyed Vatapi, just as the pitcher born (Agastya) (destroyed the demon) Vatapi

The Udayachandramangalam plates state

Narasimhavarman, the equal of Agastya, the crushed of Vatapi, who frequently conquered Vallabharaja at Periyar-Bhumanimangala, Shuramara and other places

According to the Velurpalaiyam plates

Narasimhavarman I famous like Upendra (Vishnu) who defeating the host of his enemies took from them the pillar of victory standing in the centre of Vatapi

== Aftermath ==
Narasimhavarman I constructed a Mallikarjuna Temple at Vatapi to commemorate his victory. He also adopted the title "Vatapi-kondan" or "taker of Vatapi". He carved an inscription recording his victory on the walls of the Teggina-Irappa temple in Vatapi. Paranjothi brought numerous items of war booty to the Pallava kingdom from Vatapai, including a famous icon of the god Ganesha (Ganapati) - known as Vatapi Ganapati, which he enshrined in his home-town.

== In popular culture ==
The Battle of Vatapi is the final climactic battle in the Tamil historical fiction novel Sivagamiyin Sapatham by Kalki Krishnamurthy, where the Chalukyan King Pulakeshin II is defeated and killed by the Pallava Army general Pranjothi as a revenge for the defeat of Mahendravarman I in the Battle of Pullalur and also to avenge Sivagami's vow.

== See also ==
- Pallava–Chalukya Conflict

== Bibliography ==
- Dikshit, D. P. (1980). Political History of the Chalukyas of Badami. Abhinav Publications.
- Heras, H. (1933). Studies in Pallava History. Madras: B. G. Paul and Co.
