= Badami Fort =

Medieval fortress in Karnataka, India

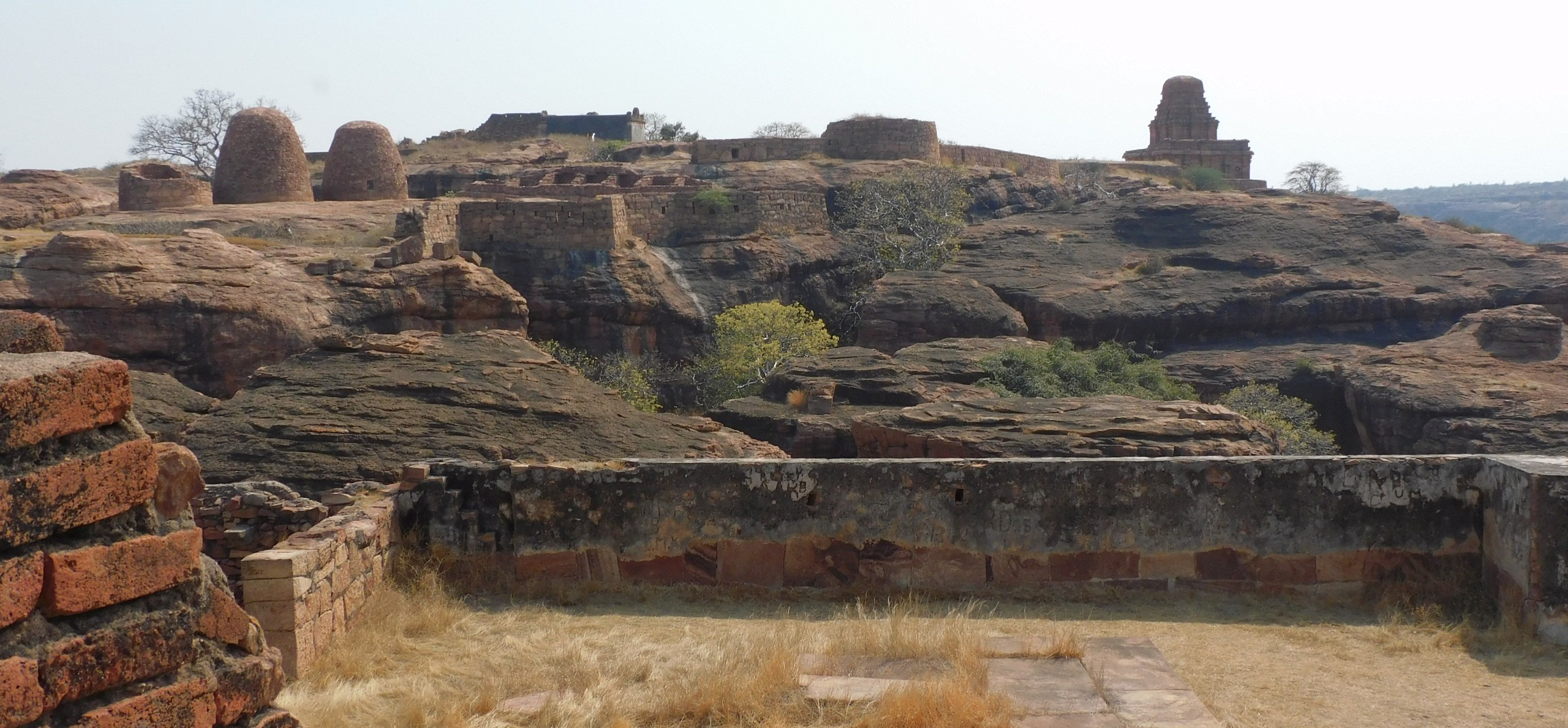
- A view of the granary storage, Treasury and Upper Shivalaya, from the Northern fort

Site information
- Type: Fortress
- Controlled by: Government of Karnataka
- Condition: Ruins

Location
- Coordinates: 15.923284°N 75.682486°E

Site history
- Built: 543 CE
- Built by: Pulakeshin I

Badami Fort is a hill fortress in the town of Badami, formerly, known as Vatapi. It is located in Bagalkot district, Karnataka, India. The fort was established in the mid-6th century CE, it was the seat of the early Chalukyas of Badami and served as the dynastic capital from about 543 CE to 757 CE. The fort complex occupies two rocky hilltops overlooking the town and Agastya Lake. It incorporates extensive fortifications like masonry walls, bastions, observation posts and gateways, as well as rock-cut passages and carved rooms. Within the fort are several ruined temples (including two medieval Shivalaya shrines), water reservoirs, granaries, and other structures. Over the centuries, the fort was modified by successive rulers from the Vijayanagara Empire, the Bahmani and Adil Shahi sultans, and the Mysore ruler Tipu Sultan before falling into ruin. Today the fort is maintained by the Archaeological Survey of India (ASI) as a protected heritage monument, and an adjacent museum display many of its recovered inscriptions and sculptures.

== History ==
The Badami Fort was founded by Pulakeshin I, the first sovereign ruler of the Badami Chalukya, who captured the hilltop of Vatapi (Badami) and “fortified it” in 543 CE. The inscriptions says that Pulakeshin I who ruled from 540 CE to 567 CE had performed the Vedic Ashvamedha sacrifice and took possession of the hill of Vatapi. From his reign, Badami (then called Vatapi) served as the Chalukya capital. Later, Pulakeshin's successors consolidated Chalukya control over much of the Deccan. In the early 7th century, King Pulakeshin II who ruled from 610 CE to 642 CE, continued to develop the Badami fortress. He built twin forts on the northern and southern hills towards the Badami Lake. Pulakeshin II's reign ended in 642 CE, when he was defeated by the Pallava king Narasimhavarman I. The Pallava commander Paranjothi captured Vatapi in about 642, ending Chalukya rule.

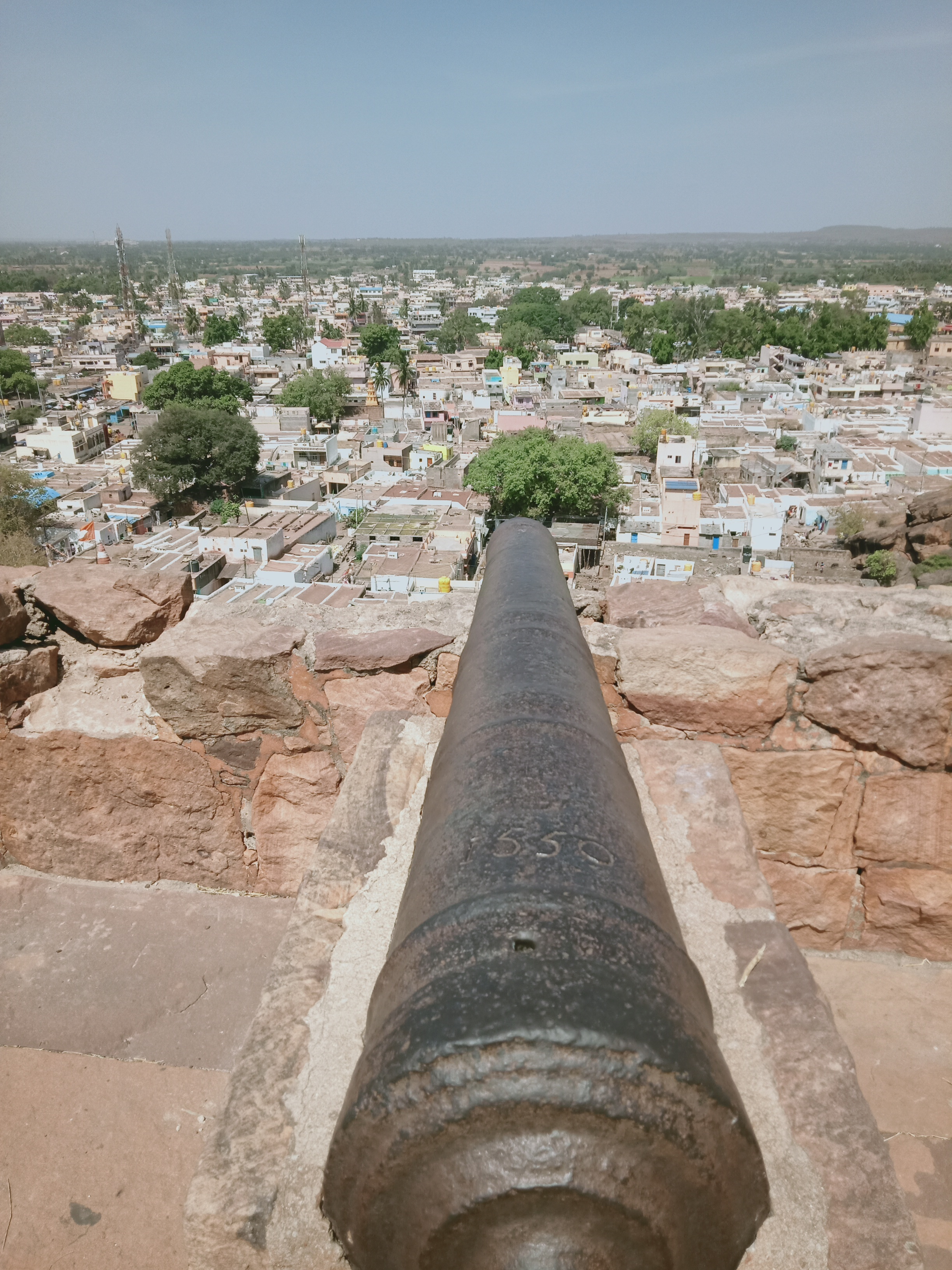
A cannon on the ramparts of the Southern fort

After the mid-7th century, Badami and its fort were invaded several times. The Pallavas held Vatapi for about a decade, and Pandya raiders held the region. By the 14th century the Vijayanagara Empire controlled much of southern Karnataka, and records indicate that Vijayanagara rulers extended and strengthened fortress walls at key sites like Badami. During this medieval period, the Adil Shahi dynasty of Bijapur had control over Badami. In the late 18th century, the fortress fell to Mysore Sultan Tipu Sultan. Tipu's forces captured Badami in 1786 during the Maratha–Mysore wars, after which he stationed a garrison at the fort. Shortly thereafter, Badami was ceded to the Marathas by treaty, and then by 1792 came under British influence following the Treaty of Seringapatam. In the mid-19th century, the British colonial government undertook "dismantling" of the dilapidated fort walls. By 1845 much of the masonry battlements on both hills had been destroyed. Thereafter, the site fell into ruin, and the hilltop defenses were abandoned. Vatapi Ganapati icon, a large Ganesha statue was once stood in a shrine on the southern fort. It was lost during the 7th-century invasions, giving rise to the Carnatic hymn “Vatapi Ganapatim Bhaje”. By the 19th century the Badami Fort was largely a ruin, though a few temple ruins and fort remains were still visible.

After Indian independence, the remains of Badami Fort were declared a protected archaeological monument. The Archaeological Survey of India controls the site as part of the Group of Monuments, Badami. In 1979, a repository was set up to safeguard artifacts from Badami, and in 1982 the ASI formally established the Badami Archaeological Museum to house sculptures and inscriptions recovered from the vicinity. The fort itself remains largely unrestored because, ASI conservation work has been limited to stabilization of walls, clearing of overgrowth, and protection of the ruined structures.

== Architecture ==
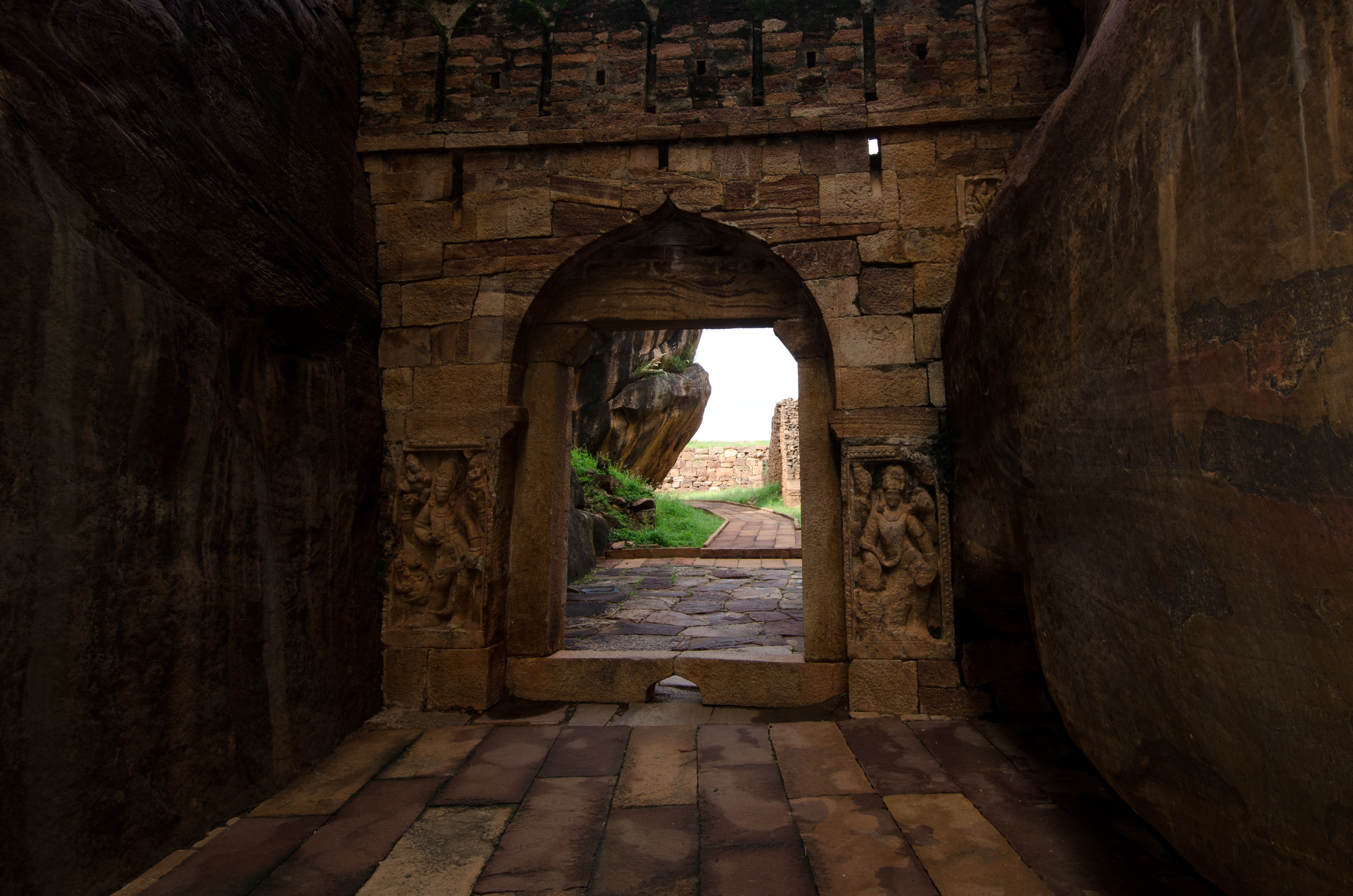
One of the entrance ways in the Northern Fort

Badami Fort was designed with an early Medieval hill-fort architecture integrated with rock-cut elements. The fort complex consists of a lower fort on the plain and two upper forts on the rocky hills north and south of Agastya Lake. The lower fort (at lake level) enclosed the town of Badami, while the two upper forts were held as citadels. According to the ASI records, the northern hill fort (the larger of the two, called Bavanbande-kote or “Fifty-two Rocks Fort”) and the southern fort (Ranamandala-kote, “battlefield fort”) stand about 300 yards apart, each rising roughly 240 feet above the plain. Both hill forts were constructed chiefly of the local red sandstone bedrock, supplemented by heavy masonry; historical accounts note that by the mid-19th century, much of the stone battlements had been removed or collapsed.

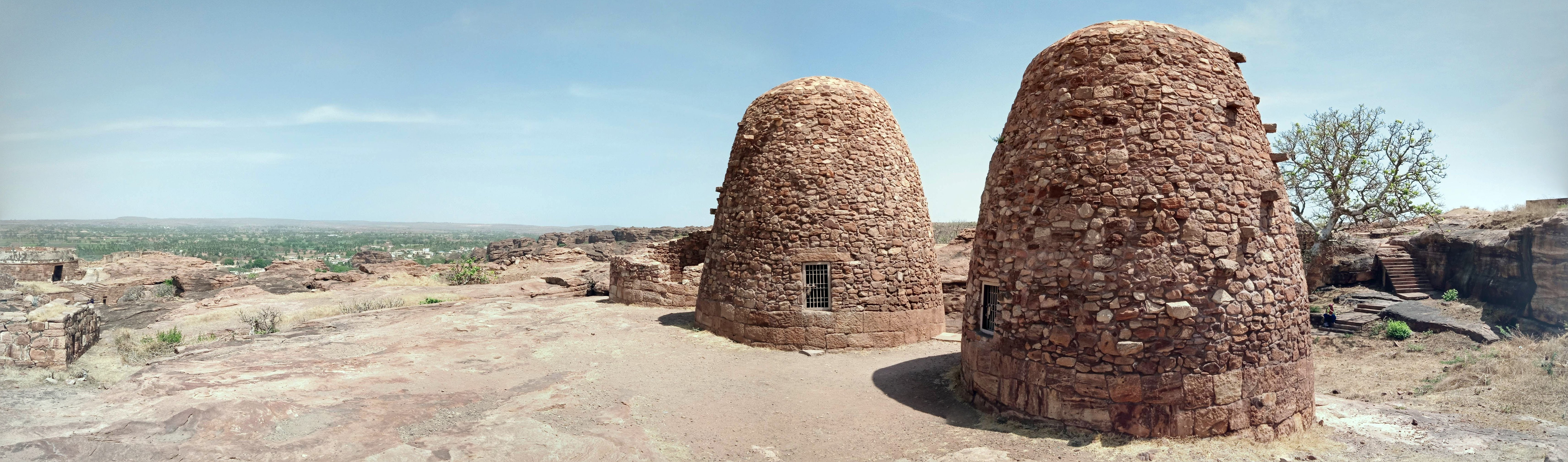
Granary storage structures

The northern fort is the dominant citadel. It is built on several massive rock outcrops divided by narrow chasms. From a distance it resembles a continuous stone wall, but on inspection one sees vast sandstone blocks joined by mortar. Bastions of various size are placed at irregular intervals along these cliffs and walls. These circular ramparts are equipped with observation posts. A straight path of stone steps climbs from the lower town to the fort gate, threaded between the chasms. The entranceway is narrow and heavily defended. A cannon is positioned on one of the ramparts, and the fort also contains a few deteriorated pillared structures along with several pavilions at the top. Additionally, there are two dome-shaped stone structures with an entrance opening, as well as storage rooms for arms and ammunition. The absence of houses or palaces suggests that the fort likely served solely as the city's first line of defense.

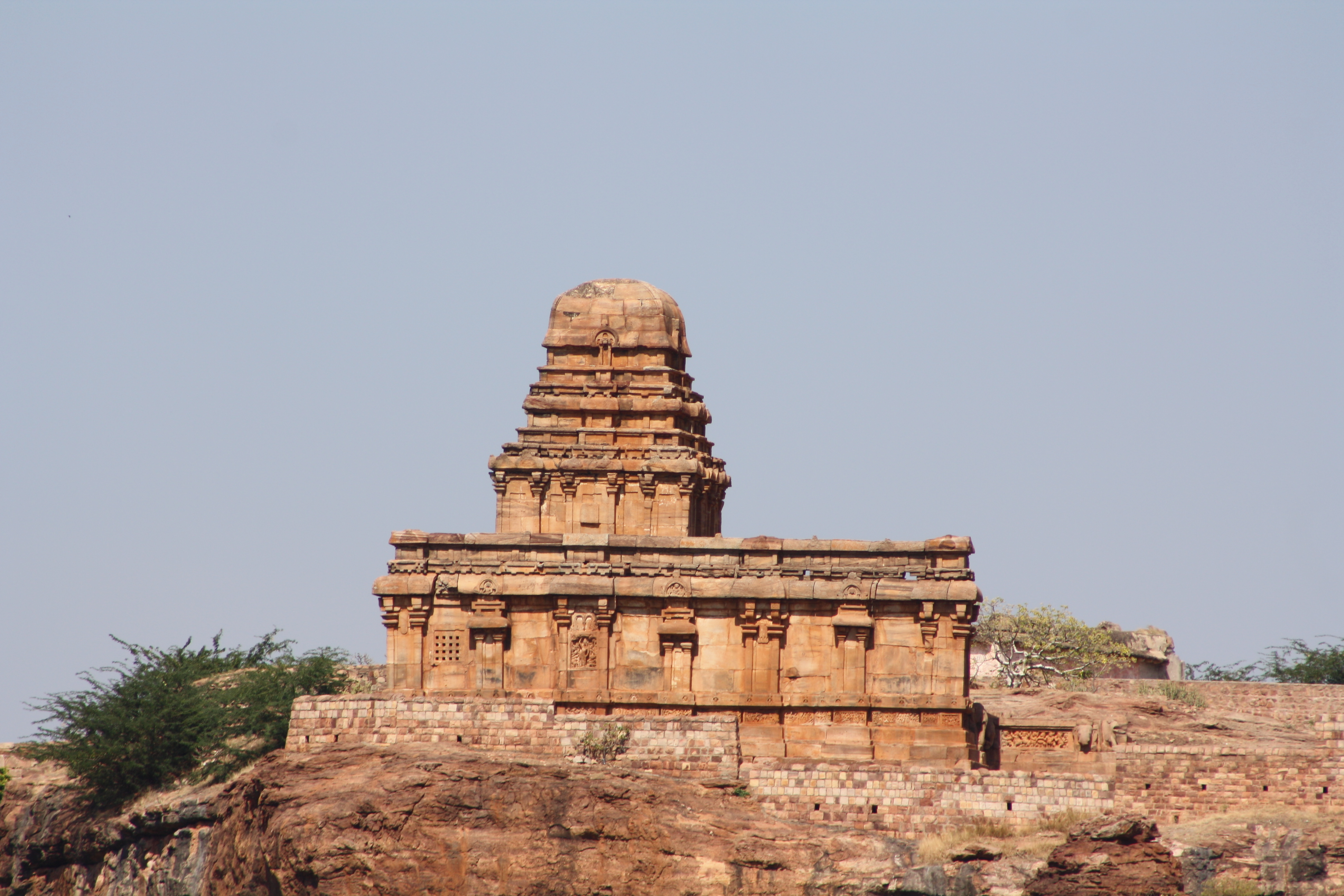
Shivalaya in the Northern fort

Two Shivalaya temples are located in the northern fort, they are called as Lower Shivalaya and Upper Shivalaya. The Upper Shivalaya (which, despite its name, appears to have been originally dedicated to Vishnu) crowns the highest point of the northern hill. It consists of a square sanctum with a circumambulatory passage on three sides and a pillared mandapa (entrance hall) on the east. The Lower Shivalaya stands on a rocky ledge below the upper temple. Only its towered sanctuary remains intact. The hall and other walls are mostly destroyed. Original features include a shrines’ passageway and evidence of a mandapa porch to the east. Archaeologists date both these northern temples to the early 7th century CE. Malegitti Shivalaya is situated on a separate boulder to the west. It is a well-preserved small Shiva temple (6th–7th century) that exemplifies the mature Dravida style of the Badami Chalukyas.

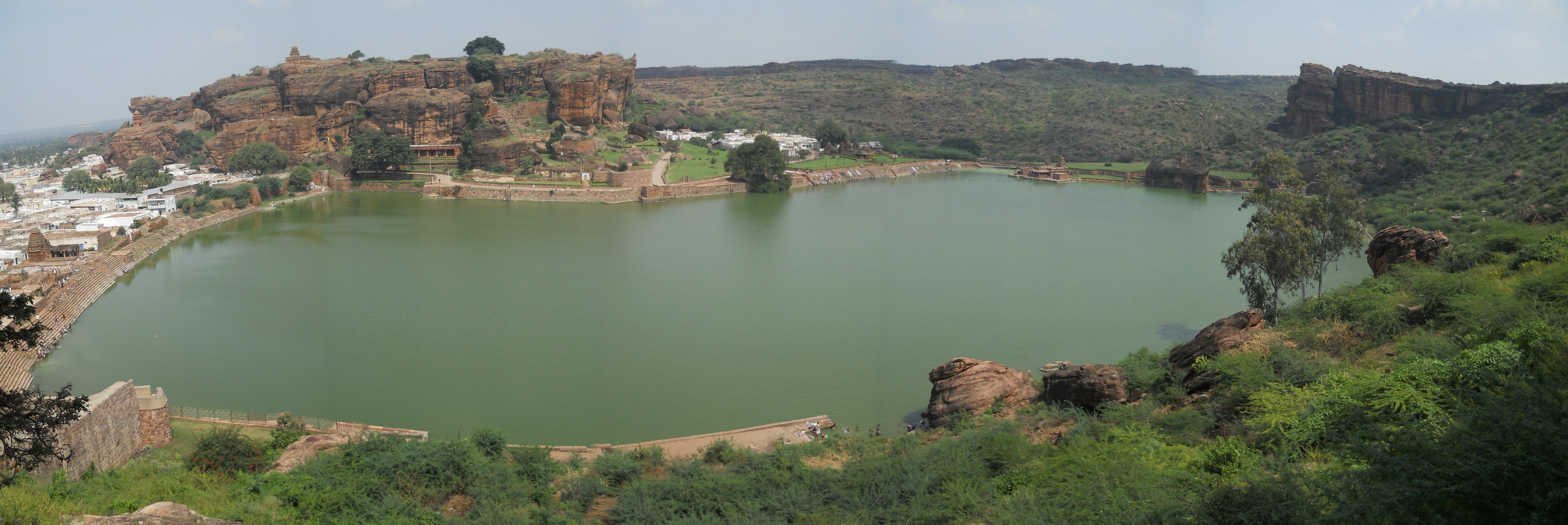
Agastya lake

The Chalukyas constructed a network of rock-hewn chambers that included halls, corridors, and various functional spaces such as watchtowers, tunnels, prisons, and bedchambers, many of which were carved directly into the sandstone and supported by granite pillars. The fort's internal layout, marked by narrow stairways, vaulted corridors, and angled passageways, reflects a deliberate defensive strategy. It is designed to slow down the troop's movement, facilitate surveillance, and control the enemy access. In contrast, the southern hill fort, though smaller, was similarly fortified with heavy masonry walls and contained a cluster of shrines known collectively as the Shivalayas. These shrines, dedicated to deities such as Vishnu and Ganesha. Agastya Lake (also called Agastheeswara Tirtha) is located to the Northside of the fort. This rectangular reservoir was artificially created by the Chalukya kings to supply water to Badami, and it remains in use. It has broad steps (ghats) on the east shore leading into the water, and its rock walls form a giant stepped tank.

== Restoration ==
Badami Fort is a centrally protected monument under the Archaeological Survey of India (ASI). Today it is administered as part of the Group of Monuments, Badami, which also includes the nearby cave temples and Bhutanatha group of temples, Badami. The ASI has designated a maintained access route up to the fort and provides interpretive signage. In 1979 the ASI first set up an archaeological repository at Badami to safeguard excavated sculptures and inscriptions. This became the Badami Archaeological Museum in 1982 Many of the fort's historic reliefs and finds (fragmentary idols, temple carvings, inscriptions) are now preserved in that museum.
