= Parthiban Kanavu (1960 film) =

1960 film by D. Yoganand

- Theatrical release poster
- Directed by: D. Yoganand
- Screenplay by: D. Yoganand
- Based on: Parthiban Kanavu by Kalki
- Produced by: V. Govindarajan
- Starring: Vyjayanthimala; Gemini Ganesan; S. V. Ranga Rao
- Cinematography: K. S. Selvaraj
- Edited by: V. B. Natarajan "Pazhani" R. Rajan
- Music by: Vedha
- Production company: Jubilee Films
- Release date: 3 June 1960
- Running time: 219 minutes
- Country: India
- Language: Tamil

Parthiban Kanavu (transl. Parthiban's Dream) is a 1960 Indian Tamil-language historical fiction film, directed by D. Yoganand. The film stars Vyjayanthimala, Gemini Ganesan and S. V. Ranga Rao, with Ragini, S. V. Subbaiah, Kumari Kamala, T. S. Balaiah, P. S. Veerappa and S. A. Ashokan in supporting roles. It is based on the 1942 historical novel of the same name, written by Kalki Krishnamurthy. The film also had actor K. Balaji in a special appearance and actress B. Saroja Devi as an extra.

Parthiban Kanavu was produced by V. Govindarajan under his Jubilee Films. Upon release, the film was well received by critics, where it won the Best Feature Film in Tamil at the 8th National Film Awards. In 2011, the film was criticised for its historical inaccuracies.

== Plot ==
In the 7th century AD. Parthiban, the Chola King, dies in battle leaving incomplete his desire to be free from the yoke of the Pallavas. His son Vikraman is determined to fulfill his father's dream. He is captured by the Pallava king, Narasimhavarman and exiled to an island where he is chosen as the king. Though he has banished him, Narasimhavarman, in fact, cares a great deal about Vikraman as the latter loves his daughter Kundhavi. Vikraman returns to the mainland to see his mother and is attacked by robbers. Narasimhavaraman, in the guise of a sage and who has been helping Vikraman constantly, rescues him. Vikraman weds Kundhavi and rules over the independent Chola Kingdom, thus fulfilling his father's dream.

== Cast ==
Cast according to the film songbook and the opening credits of the film

Male cast

- Gemini Ganesan as Vikraman
- S. V. Ranga Rao as Mamallar
- T. S. Balaiah as Marappa Bhoopathi
- S. V. Subbaiah as Ponnan
- P. S. Veerappa as Kapala Bhairavan
- S. A. Ashokan as Parthiban
- Javar Seetharaman as Siruthondar
- Balaji as Mahendran
- G. Pattu Iyer as Appar

Female supporting cast

- Indira, Sakunthala, and Indirani John.

Male supporting cast

- P. S. Venkatachalam
- Pottai Krishnamoorthi
- T. V. Sivanatham
- Gemini Sampath
- M. Krishnamoorthi
- K. G. Arjunan
- C. R. Chandar
- Master Anantharaman
- Ilaiyoor Thiyagarajan
- (Late) G. M. Basheer
- Subramaniam, Manavalan

Female cast

- Vyjayanthimala as Kundavi
- Ragini as Valli
- K. Malathi as Arulmozhi
- B. Saroja Devi as Kamali
- Kamala Lakshmanan as Sivakami
- Radhabhai as Thiruvenkattu Nangai

Dance

- Jayanthi, Kamala, Jothi, Rajam
  Rajeswari, Mohana, Chandra, Shanthi, Rathnakumari, K. S. Kamala, Leela, and G. Kamala.

== Production ==
The film was many years in the making. Saroja Devi appeared as an extra as Kundavi's companion. These scenes began disappearing later. The production was halted for many years, meanwhile Saroja Devi had become a star and was no longer available for small roles. Later, her name appeared in the credits as a guest appearance. Maniyam, who was an associate of Kalki Krishnamurthy was chosen as the art director.

== Soundtrack ==
The soundtrack was composed by Vedha. The song "Andhi Mayanguthadi" is set in Yaman Kalyan raga.

Song	Singer/s	Lyricist	Length
"Andhi Mayanguthadi"	M. L. Vasanthakumari	Vindhan	03:29
"Idhaya Vaanin"	A. M. Rajah, P. Susheela	Vindhan	03:25
"Kannale Naan Kanda"	A. M. Rajah, P. Susheela	A. Maruthakasi	03:23
"Pazhagum Thamizhe"	A. M. Rajah, P. Susheela	Kannadasan	03:20
"Malligai Poo Marikolundhu"	K. Jamuna Rani & group	Kannadasan	03:28
"Engal Kula Samudhayam"	K. Jamuna Rani & group	Kannadasan	03:22
"Munnam Avanudaya Naamam Kettaal"	M. L. Vasanthakumari	Appar Thevaram	04:45
"Vadiveru Thirisoolam Thondrum"	M. L. Vasanthakumari	Appar Thevaram	03:02

== Release and reception ==
Parthiban Kanavu was released on 3 June 1960. Kanthan of Kalki said the novel had been adapted well for the screen without losing out its taste. However, according to historian Randor Guy, the revealing of the yogi's identity in the beginning of the film was criticised as it did not build up the suspense, which had been the plus point of the novel, among the audience. He noted that this was a huge factor in the commercial failure of a good film, though the lead pair Vyjayanthimala and Ganesan proved to be an attractive pair and their scenes with excellent songs sustained interest in the film. At the 8th National Film Awards, Parthiban Kanavu won the award for Best Feature Film in Tamil. The film was dubbed into Telugu as Veera Samrajyam in 1961. The film was also dubbed in Sinhala.

== Historical accuracy ==
While analysing the 2011 science fiction film 7 Aum Arivu, where it was compared with other Tamil films about history and folklore, which had been historically inaccurate like Veerapandiya Kattabomman and Parthiban Kanavu itself, the historian S. Theodore Baskaran quoted, "The crew of Parthiban Kanavu — a film on the Pallava dynasty — did not even visit Mahabalipuram ruled by the Pallavas", while criticising the filmmakers, saying that "They do not even do basic research".

== See also ==
- List of longest films in India
