= Venkayya =

Venkayya or Venkaiah (Telugu: వెంకయ్య)is both a surname and a given name. Notable people with the name include:

- Pingali Venkayya (1876–1963), Indian independence activist and flag designer
- V. Venkayya (1864–1912), Indian epigraphist and historian

- Raghupathi Venkaiah Naidu (1869–1941), widely regarded as the father of Telugu cinema
- Venkaiah Naidu, Vice-president of India
