= Vatapi Ganapatim =

Sanskrit hymn to Hindu god Ganesha by Muthuswami Dikshitar

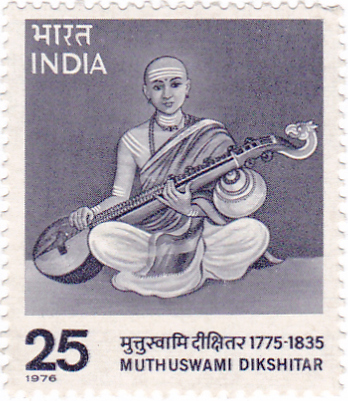
The composer of the hymn, Muthuswami Dikshitar

"Vatapi Ganapatim", also known as "Vatapi ganapatim bhajeham" or "Vatapi ganapatim bhaje", is a Sanskrit kriti song by the South Indian, Hindu poet-composer Muthuswami Dikshitar (1775–1835), one of the "Trinity of Carnatic music". The panegyrical hymn praises Vatapi Ganapati, Ganesha (Ganapati) worshipped in a shrine in Tiruchenkattankudi Utrapatishwaraswamy Temple dedicated to lord Shiva in Thiruvarur district in the Tamil Nadu state of India. The hymn is composed in Hamsadhvani raga (musical mode); however, in tradition of kritis, individual performers add their own variations in the tune as a part of improvisation. Vatapi Ganapatim is considered the best-known piece of Muthuswami Dikshitar and is one of the most popular compositions of Carnatic music (South Indian classical music school). The hymn is traditionally sung at the beginning of many Carnatic music concerts.

== Background: Vatapi Ganapati ==
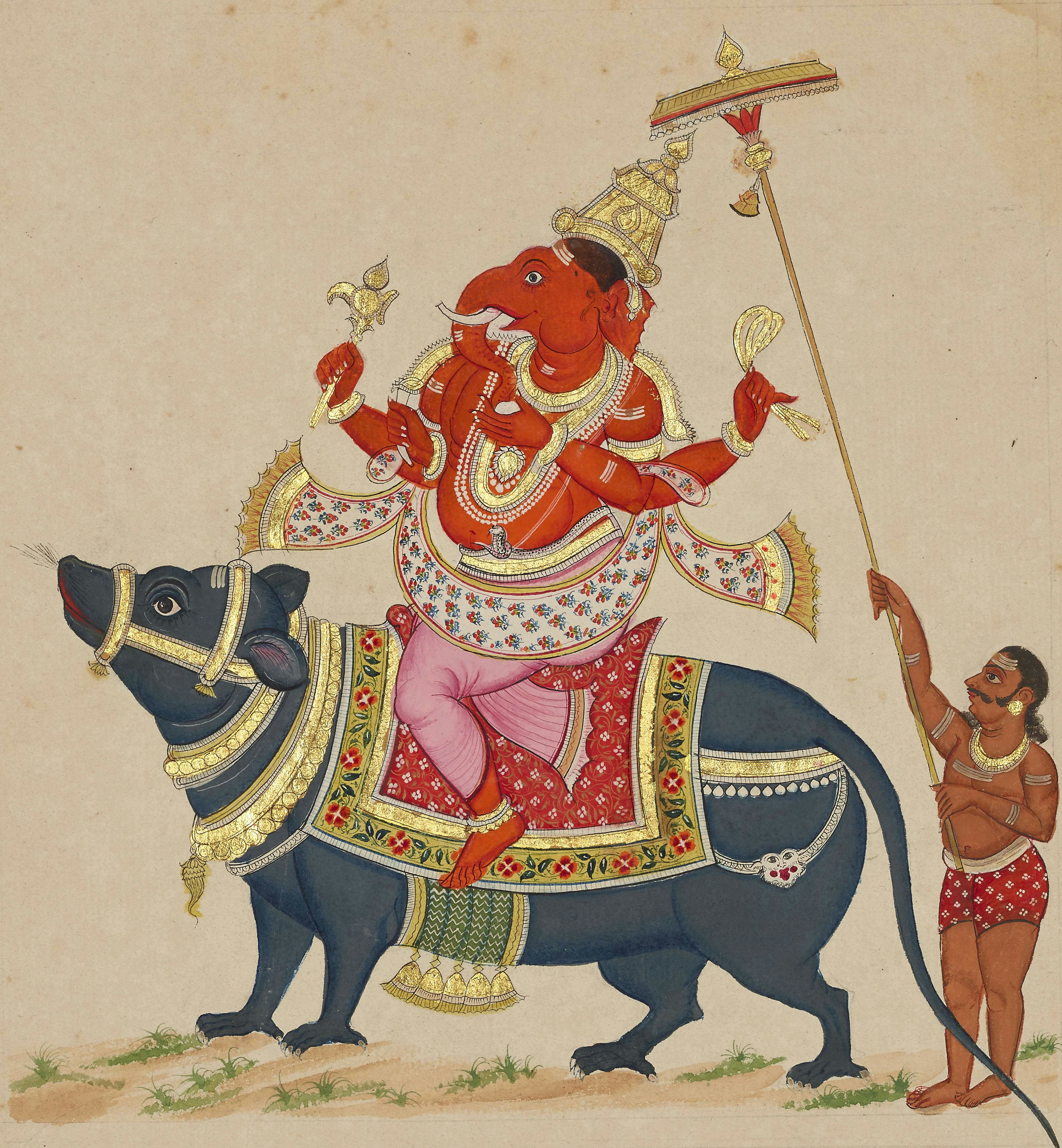
Vatapi Ganapatim praises the god Ganesha

"Vatapi Ganapatim" is a part of the series of hymns called Shodasha Ganapati kritis, a collection of songs dedicated to sixteen Ganesha icons located in shrines around Dikshitar's birthplace Thiruvarur. Vatapi Ganapatim is dedicated to the image of Vatapi Ganapati of Tiruchenkattankudi in Thiruvarur district, in the Indian state of Tamil Nadu.

As per oral tradition, the icon of Vatapi Ganapati was brought as war booty from the Chalukyan capital of Vatapi (presently known as Badami in northern Karnataka) by Paranjothi, the commander-in-chief of the Pallava king Narasimhavarman I (reign: 630–668 CE), following the conquest of Pallavas over the Chalukyas (642 CE). The icon was placed in Paranjothi's birthplace Tiruchenkattankudi. Later, Paranjothi renounced his violent ways and became a Shaiva monk known as Siruthondar, is venerated as a Nayanar saint today. However, no written records substantiate the oral tradition; the Ganesha icon is missing from list of war booty brought by the Pallava general.

The icon of Vatapi Ganapati is currently enshrined in a secondary shrine in the temple complex of Uthrapathiswaraswamy Temple, Tiruchenkattankudi, dedicated to the god Shiva, Ganesha's father. Besides Vatapi Ganapati, the temple complex also has a shrine to Ganesha, who is depicted with a human head, instead of the elephant head he is usually depicted with. The Shiva temple was known as Siruthonda Ganapatishvara, named after Siruthondar. The name "Ganapatishvara", which also gives the town its alternate name "Ganapatishvaram", denotes Shiva as "Lord of Ganesha" and alludes to the legend that Ganesha killed a demon and then worshipped his father Shiva here.

== Lyrics ==
The Vatapi Ganapatim hymn is composed in Sanskrit by Muthuswami Dikshitar. Dikshitar praises Vatapi Ganapati, as the elephant-headed god, who grants boons. The universe and the elements are said to be created by Ganesha. Ganesha is described as the remover of obstacles. He is worshipped by the sage Agastya and the God Vishnu. He resides in the Muladhara chakra and exists in four kinds of speech – Para, Pashyanti, Madhyama and Vaikhari. The sacred Om is said to be his body. Ganesha's iconography is described. He has an elephant-head and curved trunk. The crescent moon adorns his forehead. He holds a sugarcane in his left hand. He also carries a pāśa (noose), a pomegranate fruit, a guava fruit and other things. He has a large body. This form pleases his father Shiva and brother Kartikeya. The last line notes that Ganesha is pleased with the Hamsadhvani raga, indicating the raga in which the composition should be sung.

IAST
vātāpi gaṇapatiṃ bhajē'ham

vāraṇāsyaṃ varapradaṃ śrī

bhūtādi-saṃsēvita-caraṇam
bhūta-bhautika-prapañca-bharaṇam
vītarāgiṇaṃ vinata-yoginam (or) vītarāgiṇaṃ vinuta-yoginam
viśvakāraṇaṃ vighnavāraṇam

purā kumbha-saṃbhava-munivara
prapūjitaṃ trikoṇa-madhyagatam
murāri-pramukhādyupāsitam
mūlādhāra-kṣētrasthitam

parādi catvāri vāgātmakam
praṇava-svarūpa vakratuṇḍam
nirantaraṃ niṭila candrakhaṇḍam
nija vāmakara vidhṛtekṣudaṇḍam

karāmbuja-pāśa-bījā-pūram
kaluṣa-vidūraṃ bhūtākāram
harādi-guruguha-toṣita-bimbam
haṃsadhvani bhūṣita hērambam

== Music ==
Hamsadhvani scale with shadja at C.

Dikshitar composed Vatapi Ganapatim in Hamsadhvani raga (musical mode) of Carnatic music, which was created by his father Ramaswami Dikshitar (1735–1817) in 1790. The hymn is the only piece of Muthuswami Dikshitar in this raga, other than the Krithi, Parvathi Pathim; Muthuswami generally preferred "more traditional – and usually more complex -" Carnatic ragas. Ramaswami's other two sons, who were also composers, did not compose in this raga. However, the raga is still popular and has found takers in the Hindustani classical music school of North India.

According to the Tantric school to which Muthuswami belonged, the Swaras (musical notes) have symbolic associations. The note Shadja (Sa) originates from the Muladhara chakra, whose presiding deity is Ganesha. It is also associated with the notes Gandhara (ga) and Nishada (ni), the latter is often compared with an elephant's sound – thus suitable for the elephant-headed god. The consonants of these notes, ga and na also appear as the first consonants in the name of the god (Ga-na-pati). Thus, Muthuswami Dikshitar may have digressed from his usual ragas and composed in Hamsadhvani, due to the Tantric associations with Ganesha. Amy Catlin suggests that the composition is composed to conjure the image of a dancing Ganesha.

The musical compositions of Muthuswami Dikshitar were passed on orally through his descendants and 11 disciples. Subbarama (1839–1906) received the knowledge of the songs from Balaswami, his grandfather and guardian by adoption, who was Muthuswami's younger brother. Subbarama, initially reluctant, agreed to publish the songs with notes on persuasion by his patron, Venkateswara Ettappa III – the ruler of Ettayapuram and Chinnaswamy Mudaliar, the noted publisher of Carnatic music compositions. Even though Dikshitar's musical family was Tamil and the language of his compositions primarily Sanskrit, Muthuswami's compositions were printed in Telugu language, as the patrons were Telugu people and the court language of the polygars, his patrons, was Telugu. The Sangita Sampradaya Pradarshini (1904) included the works of many composers, included 229 kritis of Muthuswami Dikshitar. Subbarama provided the lyrics of the songs as well as the musical notes for the publication. The Vatapi Ganapatim, titled simply as Vatapi, included a "Western staff transnotation" as well as "Roman transliteration of the text to show underlay of the melody".

With support of the Sangeet Natak Akademi, the Madras Music Academy republished the Sangita Sampradaya Pradarshini in Tamil language in 1961 to cater to the demand of Carnatic musicians and composers of Chennai (then known as Madras, the capital of Tamil Nadu), who were predominantly Tamil speakers. The Vatapi Ganapatim, as it is known in the work, was published in volume 4 of five-volume series. This work is the main source of the hymn today.

While the publication by Subbarama was the first complete publication of the hymn, the first two sections, Pallavi and Anupallavi, of the Vatapi Ganapatim were published in 1896 by Chinnaswamy Mudaliar as an issue of his serial "Oriental music in European notation". The extract of the Vatapi Ganapatim is presented in a play in the work. In a dialogue on the Hamsadhvani, Vatapi Ganapatim is quoted as an example of the raga. The musical notations were probably written by Mudaliar by listening to a performer of the piece. The musical notations in this work significantly differ from the standard musical notation in the Sangita Sampradaya Pradarshini.

Although the piece is set in a well-defined raga, "every performance of "Vātāpi Gaṇapatim" is different, due to the importance of improvisation" in Carnatic music. The most famous of the improvised versions of the tune comes from Maha Vaidyanatha Iyer (1844–1893). Iyer repeated the lines and introduced his own variations called sangatis, a characteristic of all kriti performers. As a renowned vocalist, his version also became popular and is passed on till this day. The "most widely circulated recent notation" of the hymn was published by P. Sambamoorthy in Tamil. He notes that the hymn is sung at the beginning of most concerts.

== Importance ==
External videos
- Nadaswaram and Thavil (instrumental version)

Vatapi Ganapatim is described not only as the "best-known piece" of Dikshitar, but also one of the most famous compositions in Carnatic music. In 1991, Amy Catlin noted that the hymn is traditionally sung first in many Carnatic music concerts in Chennai. Processions with the Nadaswaram and the Thavil musical instruments often play this hymn. Vatapi Ganapatim is one of the first musical compositions students of Carnatic music are taught. The composition has also travelled to North India. The performance of the hymn at beginning of musical concerts relates to Ganesha's role as the Lord of beginnings, who is traditionally worshipped at the start of ventures by Hindus. Dancers and musicians, particularly in southern India, begin art performances with a prayer to Ganesha. According to Amy Catlin, the fame of the hymn streams from its patron deity, Ganesha, who is a popular Hindu god as well as the melodious and simple music, which was composed in a newly created raga.
