= Parthiban Kanavu =

Novel by Kalki Krishnamurthy

- Author: Kalki Krishnamurthy
- Original title: பார்த்திபன் கனவு
- Translators: Nandini Vijayaraghavan (October 2021) Sajith M. S (Malayalam, 2023)
- Language: Tamil
- Genre: Historical novel
- Publisher: MacMillan India
- Publication date: 1942 (An unabridged English translation was published in October 2021)
- Publication place: India
- Media type: Print (Hardcover)
- Pages: 400
- ISBN: 1-4039-0954-7
- OCLC: 52846173
- LC Class: MLCM 2003/00425 (P) PL4758.9.K68
- Preceded by: Sivagamiyin Sapatham
- Followed by: Ponniyin Selvan

Parthiban Kanavu (Tamil: பார்த்திபன் கனவு, pārttipaṉ kaṉavu, lit. Parthiban's dream) is a Tamil novel written by Kalki Krishnamurthy.

== Details ==
The story is a sequel to Sivagamiyin Sapatham and a curtain-raiser to Ponniyin Selvan. In 2004, Nirupama Raghavan penned an abridged (English) translation. Nandini Vijayaraghavan translated the unabridged version of the novel in 2022. In 2023, Manorama Books Published a Malayalam Translation of The Novel Translated by Sajith M.S.

== Plot summary ==
The novel chronicles the attempts of Vikraman, the son of the Chola king Parthiban, to attain independence from the Pallava ruler Narasimhavarman I.

In the seventh century the Cholas are vassals of the Pallavas. Parthiban conveys his dream of the Chola dynasty regaining its glory – which he believes is lost since they are no longer the independent rulers – to his young son Vikraman. Parthiban refuses to pay tribute to the Pallavas, triggering a battle in which Parthiban is killed. Before he dies, on the battlefield, an enigmatic monk promises Parthiban that he will make sure that Vikraman fulfills Parthiban's dream. On becoming an adult, Vikraman plans his revenge but is betrayed by his treacherous uncle, Marappa Bhupathi. The prince is arrested and exiled to a far-off island by Narasimhavarman.

Three years later Vikraman returns, longing to meet his mother and a mysterious beauty whom he saw before being deported. He discovers that his mother has disappeared, kidnapped by members of the savage Kapalika cult given to performing human sacrifices. He also learns that the beauty he has fallen for, Kundhavi, is none other than the daughter of his sworn enemy, Narasimhavarman.

Several twists and turns later, the monk is revealed as the Pallava emperor Narasimhavarman, who keeps his word to the dying Parthiban by helping establish an independent kingdom under Vikraman in Uraiyur, followed by the Chola prince's marriage to Kundhavi.

The novel ends by stating that Parthiban's dream of a great Chola dynasty was passed on from father to son and was finally realised three hundred years after Parthiban's time, in the reign of Raja Raja Chola I.

== Allusions/references to actual history, geography and current science ==
As is his wont, Kalki mixes historical events/personalities along with fictional characters. The historical characters/events include:

- Parthiban - The Chola king.
- Narasimhavarman - The Pallava ruler.
- Paranjothi aka Siruthondar — The commander of Narasimhavarman's army and the 36th of the 63 Nayanmars.
- Pulakesi II - The Chalukya ruler.
- The visit of the Chinese traveller Xuanzang.
- Narasimhavarman's efforts to abolish human sacrifice.

== Adaptation ==
The novel was adapted into a film of same name in 1960.
