= V. Venkayya =

Indian historian (1864–1912)

Rai Bahadur Valaiyattur Venkayya
- Born: 1 July 1864; Valaiyattur, North Arcot, Madras Presidency, British India
- Died: 21 November 1912 (aged 48); Mambalam, Chingleput District, British India
- Occupation: epigraphist

Rai Bahadur Valaiyattur Venkayya (1 July 1864 – 21 November 1912) was an Indian epigraphist and historian. He served as the Chief Epigraphist to the Government of India from 1908 to 1912.

== Early life ==
Venkayya was born on 1 July 1864 in the town of Valaiyattur near Arni in the then North Arcot district. His father Appa Sitarama Ayyar, a Tamil scholar, was a direct descendant of Advaita savant Appayya Dikshitar. Venkayya graduated in Physics from the University of Madras.

== Career ==
Venkayya's mastery of South Indian languages and scripts was recognised by E. Hultzsch who inducted him to the epigraphical department of the Madras government. Venkayya served as Chief Epigraphist to the Government of Madras until 1908, and then succeeded Hultzsch on his retirement, as the Chief Epigraphist to the Government of India.

Venkayya made a pioneering effort in studying inscriptions in Brihadeeswarar Temple in Tanjore and temples in the Pallava and Pandya countries. He also made significant contributions to Epigraphia Indica.

Venkayya was also one of the champions of the Parthian-origin theory of the Pallavas. He also tried to decipher the inscriptions on Mankulam Hill.

== Death ==
Venkayya died on 21 November 1912 while in service as Chief Epigraphist to the Indian government. Hultzsch, who edited the eleventh volume of Epigraphia Indica which was published shortly after Venkayya's death, dedicated the volume to him. The correspondence between Hultzsch and Venkayya was also published after his death.

== Works ==
- Hultzsch, E.; Venkayya, V.; Sastri, H. Krishna (1891). South Indian inscriptions: Tamil inscriptions in the Rajarajesvara temple at Tanjavur and other miscellaneous records of the Chola, Pallava, Pandya, and Vijayanagara dynasties, Volume 2.
- Venkayya, V. (1902). Historical method.
- Venkayya, V. (1903). Tamil Antiquary.
- Venkayya, V. (1907). The Pallavas. G. A. Natesan.
- Venkayya, V. Velurpalaiyam plates of Nandivarman III.
