= Ragamalika =

Form of composition in Carnatic music

Ragamalika, literally a garland of ragas, is a popular form of composition in Carnatic music where different segments of the composition are set to different ragas. It is also known as Raga Kadambakam, and forms parallel to the composition form talamalika which features segments set to different talas. Ragatalamalika are a special kind of ragamalika compositions featuring a range of talas. Navaragamalika is a popular type of ragamalika composition where the music is set to 9 ragas.

Ramaswami Dikshitar is referred to as Ragamalika Chakravarti (King of Ragamalika) for his varied ragamalika compositions in Telugu. Over the years, composers composed elaborate pieces such as the 'ashtottarashata ragatalamalika’ of Ramaswami Dikshitar with 108 ragas and 108 talas, and 'melakarta ragamalika' of Maha Vaidyanatha Iyer featuring all 72 sampoorna melakarta ragas.

== Compositions ==
A few examples of ragamalikas are:

- Manasa Verutarula, Sivamohanasakti nannu, Samajagamana Ninnu Korinadira, and Ashtottarashata Ragatalamalika by Ramaswami Dikshitar
- Sri Viswanatham Bhajeham, Madhavo Mampatu, Simhasanasthite and Poornachandrabimba Vadane by Muthuswami Dikshitar
- Valachi Vachi, a navaragamalika varnam by Patnam Subramania Iyer
- Bhavayami(originally only in Saveri but tuned to Ragamalika of many Ragas by Semmangudi Srinivasa Iyer) and Kamalajasya by Swathi Thirunal
