= Ramaswami Dikshitar =

18th century South Indian composer of Carnatic music (1735–1817)

- Born: 1735; Virinjipuram near Vellore, Tamil Nadu
- Died: 1817 (aged 81–82); Thanjavur, Tamil Nadu
- Occupation: Carnatic music composer
- Children: 4, including Muthuswami
- Relatives: Subbarama Dikshitar (great grandson)

Ramaswami Dikshita (IAST: Rāmasvāmi Dīkṣita, 1735–1817) or Dikshitar (Note: The -r suffix is a Tamil honorific.) was a South Indian composer of Carnatic music and the father of Muthuswami Dikshitar. He was a member of the courts of Amarasimha (r. 1787–98) and Tulaja II (r. 1763–87) of Thanjavur.

Ramaswami Dikshitar was instructed in music and music theory by Melattur Veerabhadrayya and Venkata Vaidyanatha Dīkshitar, a grandson of Venkatamakhin, author of the Chaturdandiprakashika. His ragamalika using 108 ragas and talas is notable and the longest of its type. He also composed varnams in a variety of ragas. He is popularly considered the creator of the raga, Hamsadhvani. Others believe that he was the first to create a composition using it which made it popular. His son Muthuswami Dikshitar's acclaimed work, Vatapi Ganapatim was composed using the same raga.

Besides Muthuswami, Ramaswami Dikshitar had two other sons, Chinnaswami and Balaswami, and a daughter, Balamba. Balaswami's grandson was the composer and scholar, Subbarama Dikshitar.
