= Subbarama Dikshitar =

Indian composer (1839–1906)

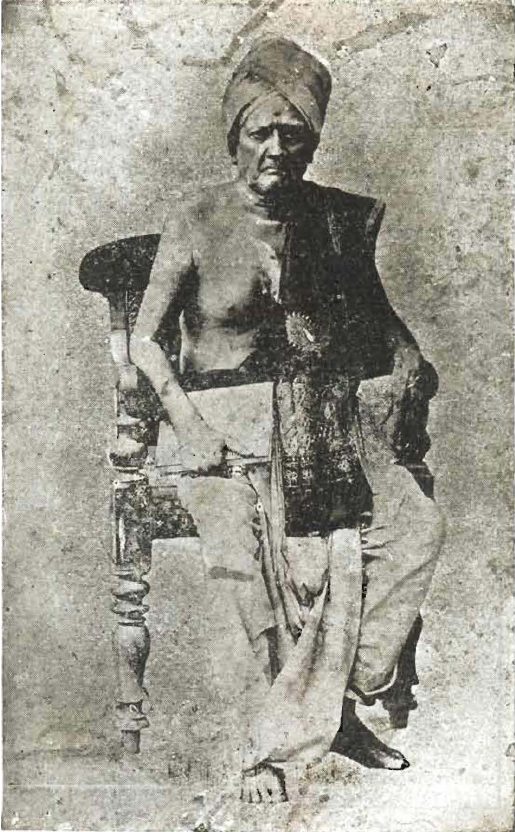
- Born: 1839
- Died: 1906 (aged 66–67)
- Occupation: Carnatic music composer
- Notable work: Sangita Sampradaya Pradarshini
- Relatives: Ramaswami Dikshitar (great grandfather); Muthuswami Dikshitar (grand uncle)

Subbarama Dikshitar (1839–1906) was a Carnatic music composer from India. He was the grandson, and also the adopted son, of Baluswami Dikshitar, a brother of Muthuswami Dikshitar. He was an accomplished composer in his own right, but is more famous for his Sangita Sampradaya Pradarshini, a book detailing the works of Muthuswami Dikshitar and a reference on many other Carnatic musical concepts.

Baluswami Dikshitar, a noted musician, was at the court of Ettayapuram kings. His daughter had a son named Subbarama. Baluswami did not have a male child, so he adopted his daughter's son Subbarama Dikshitar as his own son and taught music to him. Subbarama Dikshitar began composing at the age of seventeen and became the court musician of the Ettayapuram kings at the age of nineteen. He composed many kritis, varnams, etc. To name a few important ones - Darbar raga, atta tala varna on God Karthikeya; jathiswara in yamuna kalyani raga, mrudanga jathi (1-2-3-2-1); shankaracharyam in shankarabharana raga, adi tala; ragamalika in 9 ragas; chauka varnas in raga anandabhairavi & surati.

Subbarama Dikshitar at the age of 60 began writing the book Sangita Sampradaya Pradarshini at the behest of A.M.Chinnaswami Mudaliar and completed it after four years of hard work. It can be said that he was one of the earliest documenters of Indian music and musicology. Subbarama Dikshitar died at a relatively young age of 67.

Subbarama Dikshitar's son Ambi Dikshitar (1863-1936) was originally named Muthuswami Dikshitar, not to be confused with the member of the trinity. Ambi Dikshitar continued the family tradition of achieving excellence in music and he taught T. L. Venkatarama Iyer and D. K. Pattammal.

His other works include:

- Prathamabhyasa Pustakamu - A beginner's introduction to Carnatic Music
- Sanskrta Andhra Dravida Kirtanalu - A collection of compositions of Krishnaswami Ayya and others tuned by him

== See also ==
- List of Carnatic composers

Ambi Dikshitar's prime disciples were brothers A Ananthakrishnan Iyer and A Sundaram Iyer and were primarily responsible for bringing their Guru to Chennai for propagation of Muthuswamy Dikshitar's compositions.
