= Alai Osai =

1985 film

- Title card
- Directed by: Sirumugai Ravi
- Written by: Sirumugai Ravi
- Produced by: Navilkal Krishnan
- Starring: Vijayakanth; Nalini
- Cinematography: Jaikrishna
- Edited by: V. T. Vijayan
- Music by: Ilaiyaraaja
- Production company: Thirumal Cine Films
- Release date: 14 January 1985
- Running time: 130 minutes
- Country: India
- Language: Tamil

Alai Osai (transl. The sound of waves) is a 1985 Indian Tamil-language action film directed by Sirumugai Ravi in his debut. The film stars Vijayakanth and Nalini. It was released on 14 January 1985, and did not perform well at the box office.

== Cast ==
- Vijayakanth as Muthu
- Nalini as Vadivu
- Madhuri
- Goundamani
- Radha Ravi
- Sangili Murugan
- Senthil
- Idichapuli Selvaraj
- Master Haja Sheriff
- Loose Mohan
- Vellai Subbaiah
- Bayilvan Ranganathan
- Gandhimathi
- Anuradha

== Production ==
Alai Osai marked the directorial debut of Sirumugai Ravi who earlier assisted R. Sundarrajan. Parts of the film were inspired by the Kilvenmani massacre of 1968.

== Soundtrack ==
The soundtrack was composed by Ilaiyaraaja. The song "Poradada" became an anthem for Dalits, and was reused in two Tamil films directed by Mari Selvaraj: Pariyerum Perumal (2018) and Karnan (2021). It was also used in Karuppu (2026).

Song title	Singers	Lyricist
"Kanindhu Varum"	S. Janaki	Kamakodian
"Kuppama Petha"	S. Janaki & Chorus	Gangai Amaran
"Parkathathum"	Malaysia Vasudevan, Krishnachander & Saibaba	Gangai Amaran
"Neeya Azhaithathu"	S. P. Balasubrahmanyam & S. Janaki	Vairamuthu
"Poradada"	Malaysia Vasudevan & Chorus	Ilayabharathi
"Roja Thottam"	S. Janaki	Muthulingam

== Release and reception ==
Alai Osai was given an A (restricted to adults) certificate by the censor board without any cuts, and released on 14 January 1985. Jayamanmadhan of Kalki wrote many of the artistes were wasted for 16 reels and felt Ilaiyaraaja had used tunes which could be considered worthless for other films. Jayamanmadhan concluded the review saying those who go to the beach and listen to the waves for three hours are wise.

== Legacy ==
Following Vijayakanth's death in 2023, Film Companion included the film in their list "7 Vijayakanth Films That Left an Indian Cinema Legacy".
