= Sivagamiyin Sapatham =

1946 novel by Kalki Krishnamurthy

- Author: Kalki Krishnamurthy
- Original title: சிவகாமியின் சபதம்
- Translators: Pavitra Srinivasan; Nandini Vijayaraghavan; Sajith M. S
- Language: Tamil
- Genre: Historical, romance, spy, thriller, novel
- Published: January 1944–June 1946 (Kalki)
- Publication place: India
- English publication date: 2012
- Media type: Print
- Pages: 1056
- ISBN: 978-81-8345-154-3
- Followed by: Parthiban Kanavu
- Original text: சிவகாமியின் சபதம் at Tamil Wikisource

Sivagamiyin Sapatham (Tamil: சிவகாமியின் சபதம், civakāmiyiṉ capatam, Tamil pronunciation: [tɕivagaːmijin tɕabadam], literally 'The vow of Sivagami') is a Tamil historical novel written by Kalki Krishnamurthy, first serialized in Kalki magazine during January 1944 – June 1946, and published as a book in 1948. Along with Ponniyin Selvan, this is widely regarded as one of the greatest novels ever written in Tamil. Set in the 7th-century south India against the backdrop of various historical events and figures, the novel created widespread interest in Tamil history. Honour, love and friendship are important themes that run through the course of the novel. It is also the prequel story of Parthiban Kanavu written by the same author.

== Plot synopsis ==
It would be difficult to point out who the real hero of the novel is. Mahendravarman I, the Pallava emperor, plays an important role in the first half of the story while his son Narasimhavarman comes into his own as the novel progresses. The plot revolves around the historical events of the Chalukya king, Pulakeshin II, laying a siege of Kanchi, and Narasimhavarman avenging this by attacking Vatapi, the capital of the Chalukyas.

The novel is divided into four parts.

=== Part 1: Paranjothi's Journey ===
The novel begins with the arrival of Paranjothi in the city of Kanchi to attain tutelage under the Tamil saint Thirunavukkarasar. But he ends up saving the damsel Sivagami and her father Aayannar from a mad elephant by throwing a spear at it, almost by reflex. There is considerable unease in the town since the Chalukya king Pulikesi is on his way to attack Kanchi. That night, Paranjothi is arrested by the guards and is kept in a cell. This is because Mahendravarman wanted to meet the young man who had saved the life of his most important artists. But Paranjothi manages to escape from the prison with help from Naganandhi, the Buddhist monk who had accompanied him to Kanchipuram.

Naganandhi takes him out of the Kanchi fort through a secret tunnel to meet the master sculptor Aayannar, who stays outside the fort in a small settlement. Paranjothi plans to join the sculptor as a student and believes that should be possible since his uncle, a friend of Aayannar, has provided a letter asking Aayannar to take care of his nephew. Naganandhi, who has promised Aayannar that he would get him the secret behind the dyes used in the Ajanta paintings under Chalukyas, asks Aayannar to send Paranjothi on a trip to the Vindhyas to meet a monk who Naganandhi says, should give Paranjothi the secret formula for the dyes. Accordingly, Paranjothi is sent with a note written by Naganandhi (which actually is a coded message to Pulakesin to start immediately to invade Kanchipuram as the Pallava army is currently weak and scattered) to Ajanta (in present day Maharashtra) in the Chalukya domain to obtain secret of the dyes.

Narasimhavarman continues to visit his lover, Sivagami who had mastered the ancient Indian dance form, Bharathanatyam. But this growing romance between the prince and the sculptor's daughter is not well received by King Mahendravarman, who now orders a livid Narasimhavarman to stay in Kanchi and safeguard it while Mahendravarman goes to face Pulakeshin in the battle field.

Meanwhile, en route, Paranjothi meets a stranger, Wajrabahu, who gives him company till the inn where they decide to stay for the night. When Paranjothi is fast asleep, Wajrabahu changes the content of the letter that Paranjothi is carrying. This change would eventually save Kanchipuram as well as Paranjothi. The next day both part ways. Paranjothi travels to a Buddhist monastery and stays there for the night unaware of the presence of Chalukya spies in that monastery who sent word to the king to arrest Paranjothi. Paranjothi is captured by the soldiers of the approaching Chalukya army. He is taken to Pulakeshin and presented as a spy. Pulakeshin deciphers the letter that Paranjothi is carrying to mean the young man should be given the secret of the Ajanta dyes. Unable to communicate with Paranjothi (since Pulakeshin does not understand Tamil and Paranjothi does not understand Kannada), Pulakesin asks, to Paranjothi's surprise, Wajrabahu to interrogate Paranjothi. Having confirmed from Wajrabahu that Paranjothi indeed knew nothing, Emperor Pulakeshin orders Paranjothi to continue his journey to the Vindhyas accompanied by his soldiers and Wajrabahu. Wajrabahu informs the scared and confused Paranjothi to not worry and to trust him. Paranjothi leaves from Pulakesi's camp with some soldiers and Wajrabahu accompanying him. At night when the soldiers are asleep Paranjothi escapes with the help of Wajrabahu who takes him to the Pallava camp. Surprised once more, Paranjothi initially believes Wajrabahu is a double agent spy only to then later realize that it is in fact the Pallava King, Mahendravarman himself.

=== Part 2: The Siege of Kanchi ===
Seven months pass and Paranjothi is now a trusted and able commander in Mahendravarman's army. With the battle with Pulikesi fast approaching, Paranjothi returns to Kanchi and soon becomes a close friend of Narasimhavarman. The prince also finds him a suitable companion to describe his lost love and longing to meet Sivagami. Satrugnan, the spy chief, in the Pallava army, comes with the news from the emperor asking Narasimhavarman to launch an attack on Durveneedhan, a local chieftain who tries to attack Kanchi in this hour of crisis.

Aayannar and Sivagami, after being prodded by Naganandhi leave from their settlement to a Buddhist monastery to get away from the impending war. Naganandhi almost gains Sivagami's trust by promising her that he will make her famous by arranging for her performance in all the important sites of the Chola and Pandya kingdoms. From the Buddhist monastery Sivagami notices Narasimhavarman chasing Durveneedhan's forces and in a sudden twist of events Narasimhavarman rescues Aayannar, Sivagami from an impending flood. Unknownst to them the flood actually results due to the breach of the bank of a lake by Naganandhi.

The prince, sculptor and the dancer along with Gundodharan a student of Aayannar (who is actually a spy working for the Pallavas) take refuge in the village, Mandapapattu. The romance between Narasimhavarman further blossoms with Sivagami getting convinced that the prince would eventually marry her even though she is a poor sculptor's daughter. Naganandhi tries to assassinate Narasimhavarman but is locked in a room in a temple by the quick wits of Gundodharan. Naganandhi, however, manages to escape and steal the royal seal of the Pallavas. The emperor Mahendravarman reaches the village and almost begs Sivagami to forget marrying Narasimhavarman something which Sivagami claims is very difficult for her to do. Finally the royal party leaves for Kanchi leaving behind Aayannar and Sivagami.

Mahendravarman returns to Kanchi. Nanganandhi is arrested by Mahendravarman in Kanchi. As per the orders of the king, the fort is properly protected and is ready to face the invasion of Pulakeshin's army. The siege of Kanchi by Pulakeshin begins.

=== Part 3: The Monk's Love ===
Pulakeshin tries to bulldoze his way into the fort only to realise that Mahendravarman has fortified the city almost impregnable. He then decides to camp outside the fort as long as it takes since he believes that the stockpile of food would soon run out in the fort forcing the Pallava king to surrender. But the city of Kanchi has stocked well and continues to thrive and Pulakesi realises that his forces are running out of food and the elephants are slowly turning uncontrollable.

Pulakesin now calls truce and says he wants to enter Kanchi as the King's friend much to the disbelief and dismay of Narasimhavarman, who does not trust the sincerity of Pulakesin. But Mahendravarman tries to convince and finally makes sure Narasimhavarman is not in town when Pulakeshin enters it, by asking the prince to go to war with the Pandya kings in the south. Pulakeshin enjoys the royal hospitality. Sivagami comes from Mandapapattu and performs in the royal assemblage after being ordered by Mahendravarman. Aayannar and Sivagami stay in Kanchi waiting for the fort gates to reopen. Pulakeshin leaves Kanchi and on the final day Mahendravarman reveals how he managed to outwit him as Wajrabahu.

Mahendravarman releases Naganandhi. Not aware of the danger that awaits them, Sivagami and Aayannar leave Kanchi using a secret tunnel only to be caught by Pulakeshin's forces. Naganandhi dressed as the king Pulakeshin rescues Aayannar from the soldiers. Mahendravarman is seriously injured in a battle with Pulakeshin's forces. He is bed ridden and realises his folly of extending a hand of friendship to the Chalukya king. He orders Narasimhavarman to avenge this shame to the Pallava dynasty and rescue Sivagami from the clutches of the Pulikesi.

Sivagami is taken along with the other prisoners to Vatapi. Naganandhi confesses his love for Sivagami to a shocked Pulakesi, who promises to take care of Sivagami. Naganandhi leaves to take care of other matters at hand. In Vatapi, Pulikesi raises a victory column claiming his victory against the Pallavas. Sivagami refuses to dance in front of the Persian emissaries in Pulakesi's court. But Pulakesi devises a devious way of making her dance by beating the captured Pallava citizens and stopping only when Sivagami dances.

Humiliated, Sivagami now vows that she would not leave Vatapi until Narasimhavarman burns it down and rescues her. She cites the vow as a reason and refuses to go with Narasimhavarman when he and Paranjothi makes a secret visit in disguise to come rescue her.

The play beautifully depicts the eroding moral values during Pallava period in Tamil country.

=== Part 4: The Shattered Dream ===
Nine years had passed. Mahendravarman had died, never recovering from the injury he sustained from the battle with Pulakeshin's army. Narasimhavarman, now King, is married to the Pandya princess, Vanamadevi and has two children Mahendravarman and Kundavi. As part of his preparation for attacking Vatapi, he has had aligned with many kingdoms of south India, including Cholas, Vengi Chalukyas and the Pandyas. Meanwhile in Vatapi, the difference of opinion between Naganandhi and Pulikesi increases. Naganandhi now believes that he should be ruling the country, something he forsook when he took up the Buddhist way of life. He also hides from Pulakeshin the information that the Pallava forces are on their way to attack Vatapi. Further adding to Nangandhi's anguish is Sivagami's refusal of his presence.

Pulakeshin visits Ajanta to take part in a cultural festival and at that time Narasimhavarman reaches Vatapi. Now trapped, the citizens of the fort offer to surrender. Meanwhile, Pulakesin rushes back with his army and battle ensues between the Chalukya army and the Pallava forces outside the Vatapi fort. Pulakeshin is killed in this battle but this information is not known to the Pallavas since the body is taken and cremated by Naganandhi. Naganandhi now returns to Vatapi as Pulakeshin (through a secret tunnel) and withdraws the surrender offer.

The novel climaxes with Naganandhi being allowed to escape by Paranjothi on the grounds that Paranjothi does not want to kill a Buddhist monk. Paranjothi feels disturbed with war and the cost that humans have to pay and announces that he taking the life of a Saivite and takes up the name Siruthondar. Sivagami is united with her aging father. She is initially heartbroken on realizing that Narasimhavarman is now married, but then decides to dedicate herself to Lord Shiva of Kanchi, Ekambareswarar.

== Characters ==
Mahendravarman
Kalki portrays him as a connoisseur of arts. He is also someone who was well versed in disguising. Kalki also portrays him as a compassionate king who was easily accessible and who sought and got advice from his courtiers. Though he gets converted from being follower of Jainism to Shaivism he remains tolerant of other religions and respects their practices.

Narasimhavarman
Outshone by Mahendravarman in the first half of the book, Narasimhavarman takes a life of his own later on. He is the prince who is mad in love with dancer, Sivagami. His love for Sivagami even makes him promise her that he would even relinquish his throne if there was precondition for marrying her. He is portrayed as an disobedient lover who later cunningly deserts Sivagami and marries the Pandya princess to avoid any problems when he is planning attack on the Chalukyas.

Pulakeshin II
The Chalukya king is portrayed by Kalki as being ruthless and almost barbaric is due to his typical hypocritic nature and paints a false contrast between Mahendravarman and Pulakesi. While the former's courtiers are shown as respecting the king for his wisdom and knowledge the latter's subjects fear his ruthlessness. While the Pallava king consults his ministers and acts on their advice the Chalukya king acts more on his whims. Emperor Pulikesi's love for art and subjects' respect echoes from Kanchi to Vatabi to Ajantha to Narmadha as he was the Lord of South - Daksinapatheswara who became Parameswara after defeating the north Indian king Harshavardana of Kannauj on the banks of Narmadha.

Naganandhi
The fictional twin brother of Pulakesi would probably qualify as the villain of the novel. He does the role of a Buddhist monk and this provides him the license to move freely between the various kingdoms. He has an eye for the art and is also portrayed as a cunning statesman and spy. On more than one occasion he confesses that his love for Sivagami has more to do with her artistic abilities than her physical self. He uses the visual similarity that he has with Pulakesi to his advantage to save Ayanar. Having spent his childhood and most of his youth in a Buddhist monastery under highly challenging circumstances he possesses a body that is immune to any poison. He dedicates his life to the well-being of the state and his brother.

Sivagami
The mystical dancer who Mahendravarman claims can portray even those postures and nuances that the creator of Bharathanatyam had not thought of. She is in love with Narasimhavarman. Being alone in the sculptor's settlement she only has a parrot and deer for company. Her fame has spread to distant lands. She is also portrayed as being selfless and generous. She is ready to undergo punishment for the sake of freeing the captured women from the Pallava empire.

Paranjothi
The able commander of the Pallava army, Paranjothi is portrayed as being a brave soldier. Then he becomes a Saivite monk called Siruthondar and studies with Thirunaavukkarasar.

Aayanar
Sivagami's father and master sculptor is portrayed as someone who is fanatically in search of the secret behind the Ajanta dyes. He was so curious to know that secret that he was even ready to risk his life and escape from the Kanchi fort and wanted to talk with Pulakesi to get the information. While the self-centred father wants to know Ajanta painting secrets from Pulikesi the dancer daughter seeks revenge from Pulikesi as she feels separated from her lover prince Narasingavarman by coming to Vatapi but it seems Mahendravarman's conspiracy to send her with Pulakesi as a court dancer in Vatapi to avoid contact with his son.

Satrugnan, Gundodharan
The spies of the Pallava empire. They are portrayed as being extremely capable and have a very good sense of humour.

Kamali
Sivagami's best friend and also acts as a big sister and mother, who is also the wife of kannapiran.

Kannapiran
Charioteer for the king Mahendravarman, and his son Narasimhavarman.

Kabaligai
Ranjani is the original name of the Kabaligai, she was so much in love with Naganandhi and gave up her beauty and normal life to become a Kabaligai, Kabaligars are the people who practice Endocannibalism, The kabaligi killed Kannapiran to facilitate Naganandhi forcefully control Sivagami and flee out of the palace(the place were Sivagami was kept in captivity) through a secret passage in the well at the backyard. Ranjani's love for Naganandhi was so blind, despite knowing Naganandhi's intentions to cheat, she sacrificed her life by obeying to the commands of Naganandhi.

== Digital Availability ==
The original serialized version of Sivagamiyin Sapatham, as published in Kalki magazine, has been fully digitized by Raja Illam Media. This edition preserves the original chapter layout and the historical narrative of 7th-century South India, providing readers with an experience faithful to the initial publication. The complete digitized version is freely accessible online here.

== See also ==
- Parthiban Kanavu, Tamil novel
