= Kalki Krishnamurthy =

Indian writer

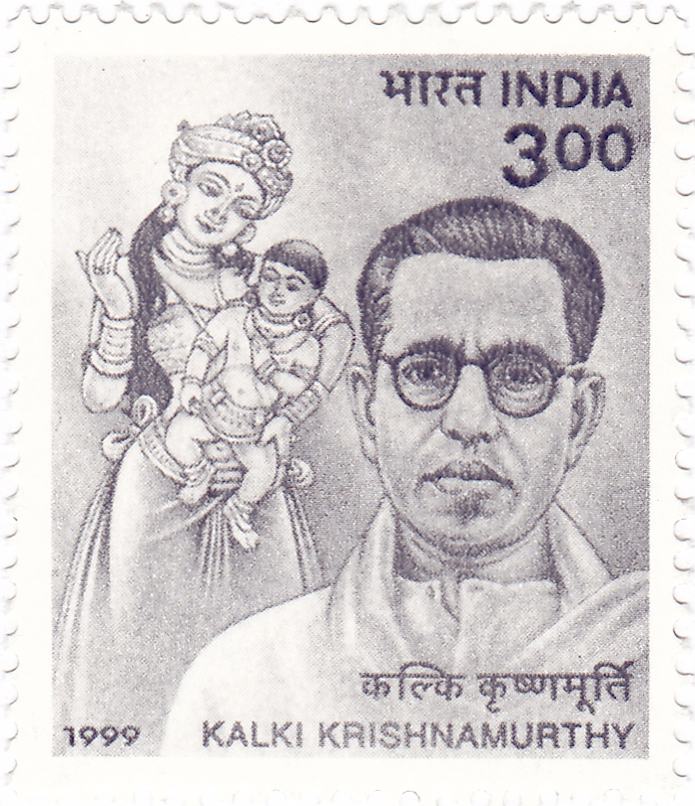
- Krishnamurthy on a 1999 stamp of India
- Born: Ramasamy Iyer Krishnamurthy; 9 September 1899; Puthamangalam, Tanjore District, Madras Presidency, British India (now in Mayiladuthurai district, Tamil Nadu, India)
- Died: 5 December 1954 (aged 55); Madras, Madras State (now Chennai, Tamil Nadu), India
- Education: Municipal High School, Mayiladuthurai & National High School, Tiruchi
- Occupations: Journalist, critic and writer
- Spouse: Rukmani
- Children: 2
- Writing career
- Pen name: Kalki Tamil: கல்கி
- Period: 1899–1954
- Genres: Historical fiction, social novels
- Notable works: Ponniyin Selvan, Sivagamiyin Sapatham, Thyaga Bhoomi, Parthiban Kanavu, Alai Osai, Kalvanin Kadhali
- Notable awards: Sahitya Akademi Award (1956)

Ramasamy Krishnamurthy (9 September 1899 – 5 December 1954), better known by his pen name Kalki, was an Indian writer, journalist, poet, critic and Indian independence activist who wrote in Tamil. He chose the pen-name "Kalki", the future incarnation of the Hindu God Vishnu. In 1941, he and T Sadasivam founded a magazine, which was also named Kalki. Krishnamurthy‘s writings include over 120 short stories, 10 novellas, 5 novels, 3 historical romances, editorial and political writings and hundreds of film and music reviews.

== Early life ==
Ramaswamy Krishnamurthy was born into a Poor Tamil Brahmin Iyer family on 9 September 1899 in Puthamangalam, near Manalmedu, in the Mayiladuthurai district in the Indian state of Tamil Nadu. Krishnamurthy's father was Ramaswamy Aiyar, an accountant in Puttamangalam village in the old Tanjore district of erstwhile Madras Presidency. He began his primary education in his village school and later attended Municipal High School in Mayiladuthurai but quit in 1921, just short of completion of his Senior School Leaving Certificate, in response to Mahatma Gandhi's 1921 call for non-co-operation joining the Indian National Congress instead.

His son Kalki Rajendran, married to Sadasivam's daughter Vijaya. Krishnamurthy's daughter Anandi was married to Sadasivam's nephew (sister's son) Ramachandran, known as Ambi in music circles. Anandi's daughter Gowri Ramanarayanan was a music critic for The Hindu newspaper, and she also learned music under M.S Subbulakshmi.

== Literary work ==
Krishnamurthy started writing fiction stories in Navaskthi in 1923 where he worked as a sub editor. He was working under the tutelage of Thiru Vi Ka when he published his first book(Kalvanin Kadhali)in 1937. He started working with C Rajagopalachari in Thiruchengode in Gandhi Ashram. He published Vimochanam along with Rajaji, a journal propagating liquor prohibition. He was working in freedom struggle and during 1931, he was jailed for six months. He joined Ananda Vikatan, a popular Tamil magazine along with editor S S Vasan. He became very popular as a critic, witty author, political commentator and short story writer. He wrote under various pen names like "Kalki", "Ra. Ki", "Tamil Theni" and "Karnatkam". He left Ananda Vikatan and joined freedom struggle in 1941. On his release, he and Sadasivam started a weekly named Kalki. He was the editor in the journal till his death on 5 December 1954.

== Works ==
=== Historical novels ===
Serial	Name	Setting
1	Sivagamiyin Sapatham (1 January 1944 – 30 June 1946)	Pallava Dynasty
2	Parthiban Kanavu (16 October 1941 – 10 February 1943)	Pallava Dynasty
3	Ponniyin Selvan (29 October 1950 – 16 May 1954)	Chola Dynasty
4	Solaimalai Ilavarasi (1947)	The Independence of India

=== Social novels (Tamil) ===
- Kalvanin Kadhali (1937)
- Thyaga Bhoomi (1938–1939)
- Magudapathi (1942)
- Abalayin Kaneer (1947)
- Alai Osai (1948)
- Devagiyin Kanavan (1950)
- Mohini Theevu (1950)
- Poiman Karadu (1951)
- Punnaivanathu Puli (1952)
- Amara Thara (1954)

=== Short stories ===
Serial	Name	Comments
1	Subhathraiyin Sagodharan	
2	Otrai Roja	This story is about two strangers – a young man and a young woman – who meet on a train from Tirunelveli to Chennai. The woman is originally from Sri Lanka and the man is from Madras (now Chennai). They have failed in their respective exams and plan to end their life. Things take a different turn from here and all ends well.
3	Theepiditha Kudisaigal	
4	Pudhu Ovarsear	
5	Vasdhadhu Venu	
6	Amara Vazhvu	
7	Sunduvin Sanyasam	
8	Thirudan Magan Thirudan	
9	Imayamalai Engal Malai	
10	Pongumaangkadal	
11	Master Medhuvadai	Collection of 5 short stories
12	Pushpa Pallaaku	
13	Prabala Nakchatiram	
14	Pithalai Ottiyanam	
15	Arunachalathin Aluval	
16	Parisil Thurai	
17	Susila MA	
18	Kamalavin Kalyanam	
19	Tharkolai	
20	S.S.Menaka	
21	Saradhaiyin Thandhiram	
22	Governor Vijayam	
23	Kanaiyazhiyin Kanavu	
24	Banker Vinayakarao	
25	Tiger King	The story revolves around a King whose death at the hands of a tiger had been foretold by astrologers when he was born. He tries to reverse the fate spelled out for him and the author uses thinly veiled satire to walk the reader through the King's attempts which later prove futile, in a manner that makes them laugh.
26	Punnaivanthupuli	
27	Devakiyin Kanavan	
28	Onbathu Kulinilam	
29	Number 888	
30	Thiruvazhundhur Sivakozhundhu	
31	Zamindar Mahan	
32	Mayilak Kalai	
33	Rnagathurkam Raja	
34	Idintha Kottai	
35	Mayilvizhi Maan	
36	Thappili Cup	
37	Kethariyin Thaayar	
38	Gandhimadhiyin kadalan	
39	Srikandhan Punarjenmam	
40	Paazhadaindha Bungalow	
41	Chandramathi	
42	Chiranjeevi Kadhai	
43	Kadithamum Kaneerum	
44	Vaira Mothiram(Kaanama pogaathathu)	
45	Veenai Bavani	
46	Dhanakodiyin Manoratham	

=== Critical work ===
Krishnamurthy was also a film and music critic, writing under the pseudonym "Karnatkam". He also penned lyrics for many songs, most of which were adapted into Carnatic Music.

== Honours ==
- The release of a postage stamp in honour of Krishnamurthy was among the highlights of the centenary celebrations. Government of Tamil Nadu announced the nationalisation of Krishnamurthy‘s works, this will enable publishers to produce reprints of his works.
- Krishnamuthy had the Sangeetha Kalasikhamani award conferred on him by The Indian Fine Arts Society in 1953.

== Death ==
Krishnamurthy died in Chennai on 5 December 1954 aged 55 years from tuberculosis. Kalki magazine's special issue for Annai Sarada Devi, dated the day Krishnamurthy died, was his last editorial work. The magazine shared the information that his health was improving prior to his demise.

== Legacy ==
Various individuals including veteran actor, director, philanthropist and former Chief Minister of Tamil Nadu, M. G. Ramachandran; actor, director and politician, Kamal Haasan; and director Mani Ratnam, have tried to adapt Krishnamurthy's novel Ponniyin Selvan, into a film at various stages, but only Mani Ratnam has succeeded so far. The first part of Mani Ratnam's two-part film was released on 30 September 2022 as Ponniyin Selvan: I, and second part was released on 28 April 2023 as Ponniyin Selvan: II.

== Biographies of Kalki ==
- Ponniyin Puthalvar by Sunda
- Amarar Kalki
- Oray Roja

== See also ==
- List of Sahitya Akademi Award winners for Tamil
- List of Indian writers
- List of Tamil-language writers
- Kalki (magazine)
- Ponniyin Selvan
- Parthiban Kanavu
- Sivagamiyin Sapatham
