= Velurpalaiyam plates =

The Velurpalaiyam plates of Nandivarman III is a 9th-century copper-plate grant which was found at the village of Velurpalaiyam, around 7 miles from the town of Arakkonam in Tamil Nadu, India. The grant records the gift of a village to a temple of Shiva by the Pallava king, Nandivarman III (r. 846–869). The inscriptions on the plates are in Tamil and partly in Sanskrit (employing the Grantha script) and additionally provide a valuable genealogical record of the Pallavas.
