= Paranjothi =

7th century Indian army general and monk

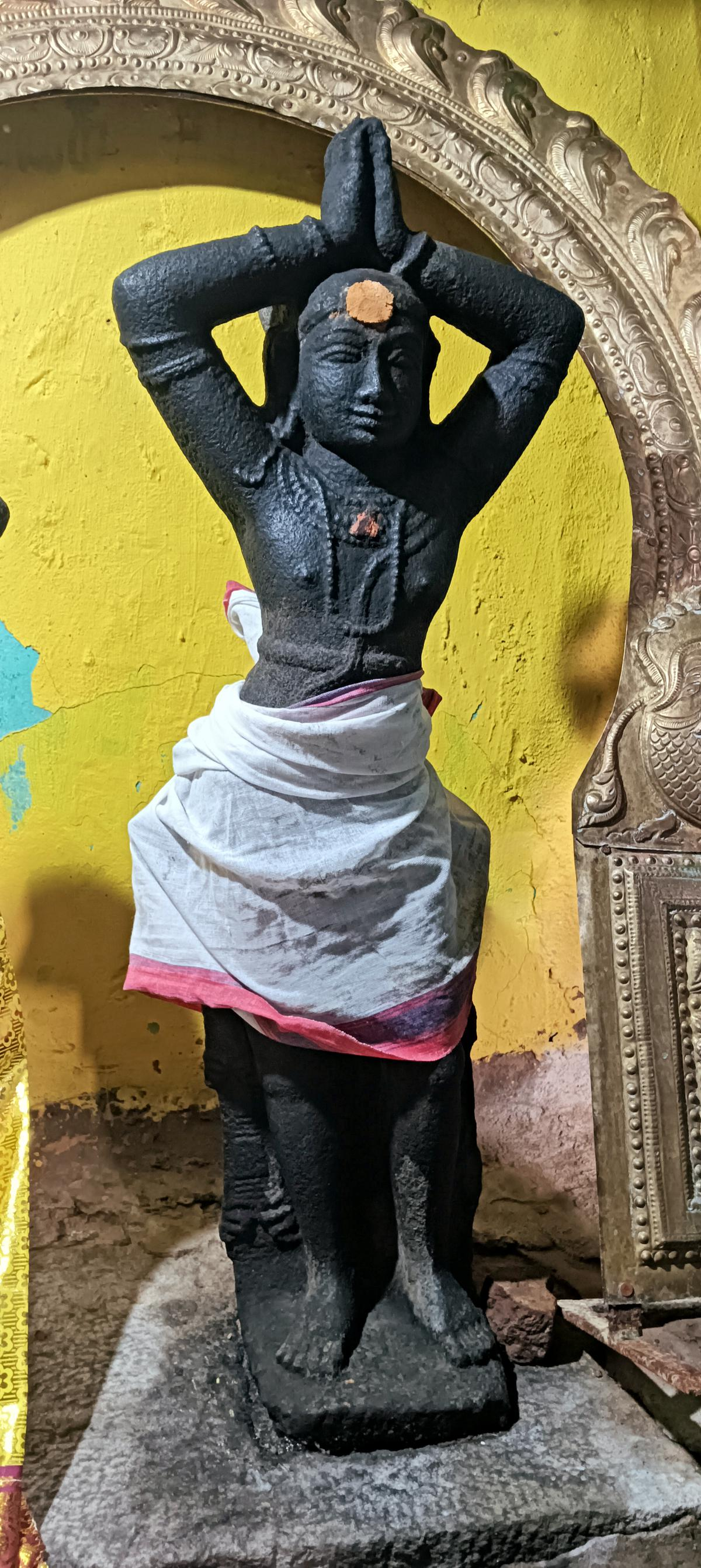
A warrior-turned-saint:Paranjothi (Siruthondar) one of the 63 Nayanars

Paranjothi (Tamil: பரஞ்சோதி), popularly known as Sirruthondar or Paranjothi Mudaliar was an army general of the great Pallava king Narasimavarman I who ruled South India from 630–668 CE. He also led the Pallava army during the invasion of Vatapi in 642 CE. In the later years of his life, Paranjothi gave up violence and became a wandering Saivite monk, Sirruthonda nayanar. He is venerated as one of the 63 Nayanmars.

== Early life ==
Paranjothi, was born in the Sengunthar Mudaliar community in the kingdom ruled by Pallava dynasty with Kanchipuram as its capital. Paranjothi, who had mastered the art of war moves to Kanchipuram to learn literature and saivite scriptures, Kanchipuram was then a renowned knowledge capital in India.

== Quotes ==
According to the Periyapuranam, in the Siruthonda Nayanar Puranam, verses 3664–3665:

"He would render always such service befitting his nature To the Lord’s devotees; he was the close aid to his Flawless king and for his sake he waged and won Many a war by leading the elephantry; by annexing The several countries of the hostile kings, He flourished well in the company Of his king who was great in the strength of his chariots.For his king he led an army to the north and razed To the ground the hoary city Vaataapi in a battle; He led his hill-like tuskers of great trunks And won the war; he captured and returned with heaps Of gems and riches, herds of tuskers and also Horses and such-like innumerable trophies of war;These he brought before his royal liege."

== Conquest of Vatapi in 642 CE ==
King Mahendravarman I, impressed by the courage and valour of Paranjothi appointed him as a commander in his army. After the death of Mahendravarman in 630 CE, his son Narasimavarman became the ruler of the Pallava dynasty and Paranjothi became his army general. Paranjothi was also a close friend of king Narasimavarman. Paranjothi as a trusted general of Narasimavarman, led his forces to Vatapi in 642 CE for war against the Chalukya king, Pulakeshin. Pulakeshin was killed in the battle and Vatapi was burnt to the ground to avenge the defeat of Mahendravarman by Pulakeshin in the battle of Pullalur in 618 CE.

According to K. A. Nilakanta Sastri and Romila Thapar, the Pallavas, following their victory over Vikramaditya I at Peruvalanallur, carried the war into Chalukya territory and sacked Vatapi (Badami) for a second time. Later Tamil tradition attributes this expedition to the Pallava general Paranjothi. However, Durga Prasad Dikshit and Anirudh Kanisetti, in POLITICAL HISTORY OF THE CHALUKYAS OF BADAMI and Lords of the Deccan, disputes the historicity of a second sack of Vatapi, noting that Chalukya records do not mention such an event and this suggesting that the Pallavas may instead have raided Chalukya territory before being repelled by Vinayaditya.

== Vatapi Ganapathi ==
During the dawn of war, Paranjothi worshipped a Ganesha sculpture on the walls of Vatapi fort. On the return from the victorious battlefield, he took the statue of Ganesha to his birthplace Tiruchenkattankudi to be worshipped as Vatapi Ganapathi. The statue and shrine to Vathapi Ganapathi is located in a temple in Tiruchenkattankudi in Nagapattinam district in the Tamil Nadu state of India.

== Siruthondar ==
On the victorious battle field Paranjothi underwent a change of heart and devoted himself to Lord Shiva. Paranjothi became an ardent devotee of Lord Siva and was then called as Siruthondar (meaning : Small Devotee). He later became one of 63 Nayanmar Saints. Siruthondar's life and devotion are narrated in Sekkizhar's Periya Puranam.

== In popular culture ==
Several Kongu section of Senguntha Kaikolars or Mudaliars have Irayamangalam, the descendant of Paranjothi Nayanar as their guru. His seat is at Irayamangalam by the Kaveri in the Namakkal District.

Paranjothi is one of the prominent characters in Tamil historical fiction novel Sivagamiyin Sapatham by Kalki Krishnamurthy. This talks about the young years of Pranjothi where he raises in the ranks of the Pallava army and becomes the army general, his deeds in securing the Kachi fort from the imminent Vatapi invasion, his war on Vatapi Pulikesi and his eventual win over the Chalukyas.
