= Dome =

Architectural element resembling the hollow upper half of a sphere

A dome (from Latin domus) is an architectural element similar to the hollow upper half of a sphere. There is significant overlap with the term cupola, which may also refer to a dome or a structure on top of a dome. The precise definition of a dome has been a matter of controversy and there are a wide variety of forms and specialized terms to describe them.

A dome can rest directly upon a rotunda wall, a drum, or a system of squinches or pendentives used to accommodate the transition in shape from a rectangular or square space to the round or polygonal base of the dome. The dome's apex may be closed or may be open in the form of an oculus, which may itself be covered with a roof lantern and cupola.

Domes have a long architectural lineage that extends back into prehistory. Domes were built in ancient Mesopotamia, and they have been found in Persian, Hellenistic, Roman, and Chinese architecture in the ancient world, as well as among a number of indigenous building traditions throughout the world. Dome structures were common in both Byzantine architecture and Sasanian architecture, which influenced that of the rest of Europe and Islam in the Middle Ages. The domes of European Renaissance architecture spread from Italy in the early modern period, while domes were frequently employed in Ottoman architecture at the same time. Baroque and Neoclassical architecture took inspiration from Roman domes.

Advancements in mathematics, materials, and production techniques resulted in new dome types. Domes have been constructed over the centuries from mud, snow, stone, wood, brick, concrete, metal, glass, and plastic. The symbolism associated with domes includes mortuary, celestial, and governmental traditions that have likewise altered over time. The domes of the modern world can be found over religious buildings, legislative chambers, sports stadiums, and a variety of functional structures.

== Etymology ==
The English word "dome" ultimately derives from the ancient Greek and Latin domus ("house"), which, up through the Renaissance, labeled a revered house, such as a Domus Dei, or "House of God", regardless of the shape of its roof. This is reflected in the uses of the Italian word duomo, the German/Icelandic/Danish word dom ("cathedral"), and the English word dome as late as 1656, when it meant a "Town-House, Guild-Hall, State-House, and Meeting-House in a city." The French word dosme came to acquire the meaning of a cupola vault, specifically, by 1660. This French definition gradually became the standard usage of the English dome in the eighteenth century as many of the most impressive Houses of God were built with monumental domes, and in response to the scientific need for more technical terms. (Note: Parker 2012, p. 97: "Dome, a cupola; the term is derived from the Italian duomo, a cathedral, the custom of erecting cupolas on those buildings having been so prevalent that the name dome has, in the French and English languages, been transferred from the church to this kind of roof [See Cupola.]")

== Definitions ==
Across the ancient world, curved-roof structures that would today be called domes had a number of different names reflecting a variety of shapes, traditions, and symbolic associations. (Note: Smith 1950, p. 6: "The domical shape must be distinguished from domical vaulting because the dome, both as idea and as method of roofing, originated in pliable materials upon a primitive shelter and was later preserved, venerated, and translated into more permanent materials, largely for symbolic and traditional reasons. 1. At the primitive level the most prevalent and usually the earliest type of constructed shelter, whether a tent, pit house, earth lodge, or thatched cabin, was more or less circular in plan and covered by necessity with a curved roof. Therefore, in many parts of the ancient world the domical shape became habitually associated in men's memories with a central type of structure which was venerated as a tribal and ancestral shelter, a cosmic symbol, a house of appearances and a ritualistic abode. 2. Hence many widely separate cultures, whose architecture evolved from primitive methods of construction, had some tradition of an ancient and revered shelter which was distinguished by a curved roof, usually more or less domical in appearance, but sometimes hoop-shaped or conical.") (Note: Smith 1950, p. 5: "To the naive eye of men uninterested in construction, the dome, it must be realized, was first of all a shape and then an idea. As a shape (which antedated the beginnings of masonry construction), It was the memorable feature of an ancient, ancestral house. It is still a shape visualized and described by such terms as hemisphere, beehive, onion, melon, and bulbous. In ancient times it was thought of as a tholos, pine cone, omphalos, helmet, tegurium, kubba, kalube, maphalia, vihdra, parasol, amalaka tree, cosmic egg, and heavenly bowl. While the modern terms are purely descriptive, the ancient imagery both preserved some memory of the origin of the domical shape and conveyed something of the ancestral beliefs and supernatural meanings associated with its form.") (Note: Downey 1946, pp. 23, 25, 26: "Architectural historians who deal with the history of the dome have been baffled and sometimes led astray by the peculiar vague-ness of some of the literary passages which in some cases form the only evidence for the existence of certain domes or of certain types of domes. When the ancient authors mention a dome, they often call it a sphaira or a sphairion. While inexact, in the geometrical sense, this is a perfectly comprehensible and justifiable method of describing an architectural element whose most prominent characteristic is its sphericity; and that the ancient writers were aware of the inexactitude, but also aware of the usefulness of the graphic image, is suggested by Procopius' reference to the main dome of the Church of the Apostles at Constantinople as τὸ σφαιροειδές, which might be translated "the sphere-like structure."" [...] "Choricius, to the writer's present knowledge, is the only writer of this period who is careful enough to note that a dome or a semi-dome is a hollow spherical form." [...] "Naturally, if one wished to describe a dome vividly, the most arresting feature of its appearance was its sphericity, and everybody knew that if you called a dome a sphaira, you called it this because it resembled a sphaira; and it was understood that a dome was not a sphaira in the geometrical sense. This is of course what one would expect, and the phenomenon is by no means confined to post-classical Greek literature.") (Note: Mainstone 2000, p. 1: "Architecturally, the dome may be seen not only as a structure but also as shelter, spatial enclosure, silhouette, or symbolic form with divers connotations stemming from past uses. To review all these aspects of its history would be impossible in a brief survey.") The shapes were derived from traditions of pre-historic shelters made from various impermanent pliable materials and were only later reproduced as vaulting in more durable materials. The hemispherical shape often associated with domes today derives from Greek geometry and Roman standardization, but other shapes persisted, including a pointed and bulbous tradition inherited by some early Islamic mosques. (Note: Smith 1950, pp. 8–9: "The most primitive and natural shape, derived directly from a round hut made of pliable materials tied together at the top and covered with leaves, skins or thatch, was the pointed and slightly bulbous dome which is so common today among the backward tribes of Nubia and Africa (Fig. 93). This type of dome, resembling a truncated pine cone or beehive, is preserved in the tholos tombs of the Mediterranean (Fig. 63), the rock-cut tombs of Etruria and Sicily (Figs. 64, 65), in the Syrian qubab huts (Fig. 88), on the tomb of Bizzos (Fig. 61) and on many of the early Islamic mosques (Figs. 38–43). To distinguish this shape of dome from the geometric cone we will call it conoid, because of its recognized likeness to the actual pine cone. Other types of domical shapes, flatter and unpointed, were derived from the tent and preserved as tabernacles, ciboria and baldachins (Figs. 144–151). These tent forms, however, could be puffed-up and bulbous owing to the light framework of the roof, as is shown by the celestial baldachin above the great altar of Zeus at Pergamum (Fig. 106) and the Parthian dome among the reliefs of the arch of Septimius Severus at Rome (Fig. 228). There were also in Syria and other parts of the Roman Empire sacred rustic shelters whose ritualistic and domical coverings sometimes had an outward curving flange at the bottom of the dome as the thatch was bent out to form an overhang (Figs. 111–117). In other examples the curve of their light domical roof was broken by the horizontal bindings which held the thatch in place (Fig. 10). The hemispherical shape, which is today so commonly associated with the dome, undoubtedly acquired its geometric curve largely from the theoretical interests of the Greek mathematicians and the practical considerations of Roman mechanics. This Roman standardization of the domical shape, which made it easier to construct accurately in brick, stone and concrete, became the customary form of the antique domical vault.")

Modern academic study of the topic has been controversial and confused by inconsistent definitions, such as those for cloister vaults and domical vaults. (Note: Dodge 1984, pp. 265–267: "Domes have been the subject of controversy for more than a century. The origins of dome construction and the ways in which it was applied have both been heatedly debated In the light of this, two questions arise. Have some scholars made too much of these matters, thereby creating unnecessary problems and a false controversy? And was there really any 'problem' as regards the dome and the square bay? The underlying issue, however, is that of terminology. Respected scholars have plunged into the debate, only to confuse the situation further by the omission of an adequate definition of terms. Where definitions are given, they are either inconsistent through the text, or do not correspond to those in general use. This leads to confusion, misunderstanding and 'problems with domes'. One thing that most scholars agree upon is that the dome is a kind of vault. R. J. Mainstone defines a dome as "A spanning space-enclosing structural element circular in plan and commonly hemispherical or nearly so in total form". R. Krautheimer defines it as "a hemispherical vault" and the Penguin Dictionary of Architecture gives the following definition "A vault of even curvature erected on a circular base. The section can be segmental, semicircular, pointed or bulbous". Thus it emerges that the term 'dome' is non-specific, a blanket-word to describe an hemispherical or similar spanning element. When such a vault is placed on a circular wall, as in the Pantheon in Rome, the 'Temple of Mercury' at Bala or the Tor de'Schiavi on the Via Praenestina, there is little disagreement or variation in the term applied to the roofing element; it is a dome. Problems start to occur in recent critical literature when such an element is placed over an octagonal, polygonal or square bay.") (Note: Dodge 1984, pp. 268–270: "The Penguin Dictionary of Architecture gives the following definition of a 'domical vault': "A vault rising direct on a square or polygonal base, the curved surfaces separated by groins". In American and some British publications this feature is called a 'cloister vault' and this has given rise to some of the terminological confusion. However, both Mainstone and Krautheimer, who both use the term 'cloister vault', do point out that it is also called a domical vault. Mainstone's definition is: "A vault approximating to the dome but polygonal rather than circular in plan"; and Krautheimer's definition is: "A vault composed of four, eight or twelve curved surfaces, as would result from the interpenetration of two, four or six barrel-vaults of equal height and diameter; also four-sided, eight-sided, etc, dome". These two definitions exactly describe the Domus Augstana [sic] and Bostra examples. Rivoira'a [sic] definition of the Domus Aurea dome demonstrates how unnecessarily convoluted some terms get. He refers to it as a 'cloister vault dome'. He also calls the domical vault 'the ungroined cloister dome'. The term domical vault can be applied to such a vault on a square base, that is, made up of four panels, as Krautheimer points out. It is with this particular kind of domical vault that even more acute problems of definition have arisen in the past. Butler, in his description of the South Baths at Bostra, calls the octagonal dome, referred to above, an 'eight-sided dome'. The two square rooms of the complex (R and T on Butler's plan) were also vaulted. That over room R is still intact and Butler refers to it as a 'cloistered vault' or a 'square dome'. The first term, as already demonstrated, is the American term for the domical vault, but by its qualification as a square dome has caused some scholars to make some rather misguided statements. Ward-Perkins refers to the structure as a domical vault. Creswell refers to the 'square dome of the Praetorium at Musmiye (ancient Phaena), at the same time giving the French and German terms, voute en arc de cloître and klosterküppel. It is obvious from these that he means the domical or cloister vault. However, Swift calls this kind of vault "the so-called cloister dome on a square plan". By this definition it becomes obvious what kind of structure he is referring to, and he also gives Musmiye as an example.") Dictionary definitions of the term "dome" are often general and imprecise. (Note: Chilton 2000, p. 131: "In the mind of an engineer a dome is structure with a very distinct behavior. It is a synclastically-curved, three dimensional surface, primarily stressed in compression under its own weight and applied loading, and made of a material resistant to such forces (usually masonry or some form of concrete). Circumferential tension forces that may occur at the base of a dome are usually resisted by a tension ring. However, a dictionary definition of the word dome may be less precise. For instance, in a typical concise dictionary a dome is defined as: - 'dome, n., & v.t.l. Stately building, mansion, (poet.); rounded vault as roof, with circular, elliptical or polygonal base, large cupola; natural vault, canopy, (of sky, trees, etc.); rounded summit of hill etc.; hence domed, domic(al), dome-like, domy. 2. v.t. Cover with, shape as, dome. [F. f. It. duomo cathedral, dome, (& direct) f. L domus house]' In the past the stately building often had a masonry dome whereas, due to the rapid expansion in structural systems that have become available in the 20th century, this is now less likely to be the case. This has led to many modern large-span structures being described as domes when their primary load-bearing system does not exactly accord with the engineering definition. Some actually work almost entirely in tension, although they still may be more or less dome-shaped (for example the Millennium Dome in Greenwich). This paper, therefore, addresses the conflict that now exists between the precise engineering and more general dictionary definitions of the term dome by reviewing the development of various types of lightweight and tensile domes during the 20th century.") Generally-speaking, it "is non-specific, a blanket-word to describe an hemispherical or similar spanning element." (Note: Osborne 2004, p. 11: "While dome has become the most used English geometric and architectural term for "a large hemispherical, approximately hemispherical or spheroidal vault" (Delbridge, 1981), cupola is the older term.") Published definitions include: hemispherical roofs alone; (Note: Saylor 1994, p. 56: "dome, a hemispherical roof form.") (Note: Parker 2003: "Definition dome [ARCHITECTURE] A hemispherical roof.") (Note: Gorse, Johnston & Pritchard 2012, p. 115: "dome 1. A structure that has a hemispherical roof. 2. A curved layer of rock strata, formed by an upward fold.") revolved arches; (Note: Coates, Brooker & Stone 2009, p. 76: "A dome is a structural element conventionally used to cover large spaces. It is defined as an arch that has been rotated around its vertical axis.") (Note: Guedes 2016, p. 174: "The dome may be regarded as the three-dimensional counterpart of the arch. In its true circular form, a vertical arch is rotated around a vertical axis and sweeps out, at every level, a continuous circular horizontal ring. Loads can be transmitted both along the meridian lines of the vertical arches and around the horizontal rings.") (Note: Palmer 2016, p. 123: "The dome, which is created from an arch turned on its axis 360 degrees, is traditionally considered one of the most important Ancient Roman architectural inventions.") and vaults on a circular base alone, (Note: Dodge 1984, p. 277: "Dome A vault of usually even curvature erected on a circular base whose elements are set radially rather than corbelled. The profile can vary. The term can be applied in a general way to other domical forms (Such as the domical and sail vault)") (Note: Trachtenberg & Hyman 1986, p. 583: "Dome A curved vault that is erected on a circular base and that is semicircular, pointed, or bulbous in section. If raised over a square or polygonal base transitional squinches or pendentives must be inserted at the corners of the base to transform it into a near circle.") (Note: Fleming, Honour & Pevsner 1991, pp. 126–127: "Dome. Vault of even curvature on a circular base. The section can be segmental, semicircular, pointed, or bulbous. If a dome is to be erected on a square base, members must be interpolated at the corners to mediate between the square and the circle. They can be pendentives of squinches. A pendentive is a spherical triangle; its curvature is that of a dome whose diameter is the diagonal is the diagonal of the initial square. The triangle is carried to the height which allows the erection on its top horizontal of the dome proper. A squinch is either an arch or arches of increasing radius projecting one in front of the other, or horizontal arches projecting in the same manner. If squinches are placed in the corners of the square and enough arches are erected on them they will result in a suitable base-line for the dome. In all these cases the dome will have the diameter of the length of one side of the square. It can be placed direct on the circular base-line, when this is achieved, or a drum, usually with windows, can be interpolated. If the dome has no drum and is segmental, it is called a saucer dome. If it has no drum and is semicircular, it is called a calotte. Another method of developing a dome out of a square is to take the diagonal of the square as the diameter of the dome. In this case the dome starts as if by pendentives, but their curvature is then continued without any break. Such domes are called sail vaults, because they resemble a sail with the four corners fixed and the wind blowing into it. A domical vault is not a dome proper. If on a square base, four webs (cells) rise to a point separated by groins (see vault). The same can be done on a polygonal base. An umbrella, parachute, pumpkin or melon dome is a dome on a circular base, but also divided into individual webs, each of which, however, has a base-line curved segmentally in plan and curved in elevation.") (Note: Curl 2003, p. 220: "A domical vault is not a true dome. A dome is a vault with a segmental, semicircular, bulbous, or pointed section rising from a circular base.") (Note: Ambrose, Harris & Stone 2008, p. 41: "A concave structural element, erected on a circular base, and usually the shape of a semi-sphere. A dome has a curved surface and functions much like an arch, but provides support in all directions. Larger domes often have two or even three layers: the top and bottom are decorative, while the centre layer is structural and supports the other two. Domes can be segmental, semicircular, pointed or bulbous.") (Note: Clarke 2010, p. 79: "dome A vault of even curvature over a circular base; the section can be segmental, semicircular, pointed, or bulbous. If a vault is erected over a square base, squinches or pendentives must be inserted at the corners to connect the dome to the base.") (Note: Ching 2011, p. 62: "A vaulted structure having a circular plan and usually the form of a portion of a sphere, so constructed as to exert an equal thrust in all directions.") (Note: Burden 2012, p. 155: "Dome: a curved roof structure that spans an area on a circular base, producing an equal thrust in all directions. A cross section of the dome can be semicircular, pointed, or segmented.") circular or polygonal base, (Note: Kurtz 2004, p. 378: "Dome" [...] "1. A construction in the form of a spherical cap realized on a circular or polygonal plan. 2. The internal surface of a dome. Syn. with CUPOLA. 3. A surface of revolution generated by any meridian curve turning around a vertical axis. Horizontal sections are circular rings and the dome picks up on its bearings by a circular belt. 4. Syn, with CAVITY; OPEN; POT-HOLE") (Note: Ching, Jarzombek & Prakash 2007, p. 761: "A vaulted structure having a circular or polygonal plan and usually the form of a portion of a sphere, so constructed so as to exert an equal thrust in all directions.") (Note: Davies & Jokiniemi 2008, p. 118: "Dome 1 a hollow, flattened or raised hemispherical roof structure, often of masonry, which rests on a circular, square, or polygonal base. See below. See types of dome illustration. See classical temple illustration. bulbous dome, see onion dome. drum dome. glass dome. half dome. melon dome, see umbrella dome. onion dome. parachute dome, see umbrella dome. pendentive dome. pumpkin dome, see umbrella dome. sail dome, sail vault. saucer dome. semi dome, see half dome. umbrella dome. 2 see domelight.") (Note: Parker 2012, p. 90: "Cupola (Ital.), a concave ceiling, either hemispherical or of any other curve, covering a circular or polygonal area; also a roof, the exterior of which is either one of these forms, usually called a dome, and in Latin tholus.") (Note: Davies & Jokiniemi 2012, p. 143: "Dome 1 a hollow, flattened or raised hemispherical roof structure, often of masonry, which rests on a circular, square, or polygonal base. See Types included as separate entries are listed below: bulbous dome, see onion dome; drum dome; half dome; melon dome, see umbrella dome; onion dome; parachute dome, see umbrella dome; pendentive dome; pumpkin dome, see umbrella dome; sail dome, sail vault; saucer dome; semi dome, see half dome; umbrella dome. 2 see domelight.") circular, elliptical, or polygonal base, (Note: Cowan & Smith 1998, p. 73: "A vault of double curvature, both curves being convex upwards. Most domes are portions of a sphere; however, it is possible to have a dome of non-spherical curvature on a circular plan, or to have a dome on a non-circular plan, such as an ellipse, an oval or a rectangle.") (Note: McNeil 2002, p. 879: "A dome is a convex rounded roof covering the whole or a part of a building with a base on the horizontal plane which is circular, elliptical or polygonal. In vertical section the dome may be hemispherical, partly elliptical, saucer-shaped, or formed like a bulb (the so-called onion domes to be seen in eastern Europe).") (Note: Curl & Wilson 2015, pp. 236–237: "Cupola, essentially a species of vault, constructed on a circular, elliptical, or polygonal plan, bulbous, segmental, semicircular, or pointed in vertical section. It can be built on top of a structure the plan of which is identical to that of the dome: if that structure's wall is circular or elliptical it is a drum (often pierced with windows) as in a rotunda. However, domes usually provide cover for a square- or rectangular-planned building or compartment, so adjustments are made to facilitate the transition from the square to the circular, elliptical, or polygonal base of the cupola or dome. This is achieved by means of pendentives (fragments of a sail-vault, resembling a species of concave, distorted, almost triangular spandrels, rising up from the corner at the top of the right-angled compartment to the circular or elliptical base of the drum or cupola) or squinches (small arch or series of parallel arches of increasing radius spanning the angle of the square compartment). Both the drum and cupola will have a diameter the same dimension as the side of the square on which the whole structure stands. Types of dome include: calotte: low cupola or saucer dome of segmental vertical section, like a skull-cap; cloister-vault: as domical vault; domical vault: cloister-vault, not a true dome, but formed of four or more (depending on the shape of the base) cells or webs forming groins where they touch vertically and rising to a point; melon: as parachute; Pantheon: low dome on the exterior, often stepped, resembling that of the Pantheon in Rome, and coffered on the interior, widely copied by Neo-Classical architects; parachute: melon, pumpkin, or umbrella dome standing on a scalloped circular base and formed of individual webs, segmental on plan, joined on groins or ribs. Each web has a concave interior and convex exterior so it resembles a parachute, rather than an umbrella; pumpkin: as parachute; sail dome: dome resembling a billowing sail over a square compartment with its diameter the same dimension as the diagonal instead of the side of the square below, enabling the structure to rise as though on pendentives but continuing without interruption. Pendentives are really part of a sail-dome and themselves are a species of sail-vault; umbrella: as parachute.") or an undefined area. (Note: Heyman 1997, p. 27: "A dome is a rounded vault forming a roof over a large interior space." [...] "The rounded vault of the dome can take many forms. Perhaps the simplest of these is a shell of revolution, in which every horizontal section is circular; an egg in an egg-cup is a shell of this kind.") (Note: Mainstone 2000, p. 1: "Structurally, I take the term dome to denote, as it normally does, a doubly curved form supported from below and acting primarily in arching compression as it spans the space it encloses.") (Note: Harris 2005, p. 319: "Dome 1. A curved roof structure spanning an area; often hemispherical in shape. 2. A square prefabricated pan form; used in two-way joist (waffle) concrete floor construction. 3. A vault substantially hemispherical in shape, but sometimes slightly pointed or bulbous; a ceiling of similar form. Also see geodesic dome and saucer dome.") (Note: Brett 2012, p. 20: "Dome a vaulted roof; normally circular or polygonal in plan and semicircular, segmental or pointed in section. See also Cupola and Squinch.") (Note: Hourihane 2012, p. 301: "Rounded vault covering an interior space. A very small dome roof, for example a lantern mounted on the eye of a dome proper (e.g. St Paul's Cathedral, London), is known as a cupola. In Italian cupola is used for a monumental dome." [...] "A dome can either be composed of curved segments or be a shell of revolution. The dome at Florence Cathedral by Filippo Brunelleschi (1377–1446) is segmental, octangular at every section. A shell of revolution is generated by rotating an arch about a vertical central axis. To produce a hemispherical surface the arch will be semicircular, but and shape of arch, similarly rotated, will give rise to a shell of revolution; and every horizontal cross-section is still circular. The simplest form of dome is that of such a shell of revolution: for example, the inner masonry dome of St Paul's Cathedral is roughly hemispherical, and has an open eye, while the main dome is conical; but both are shells of revolution, as is the surface of the timber outer dome. A dome can have either a single or a double shell.") (Note: Harris 2013: "Dome 1. A curved roof structure spanning an area; often hemispherical in shape. 2. A vault substantially hemispherical in shape, but sometimes slightly pointed or bulbous; a ceiling of similar form.") (Note: Murray, Murray & Jones 2013, p. 151: "dome A structure that can be either circular in plan, or oval, hexagonal, octagonal, or a combination of these forms. It may have a high profile, or hemispherical, or flattened.") Definitions specifying vertical sections include: semicircular, pointed, or bulbous; semicircular, segmental or pointed; semicircular, segmental, pointed, or bulbous; semicircular, segmental, elliptical, or bulbous; and high profile, hemispherical, or flattened. Domes with a circular base are called "circular domes", regardless of the shape of their cross-section.

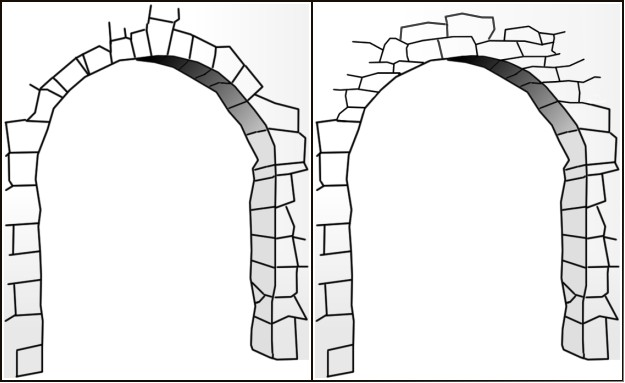
Comparison of a generic "true" arch (left) and a corbel arch (right)

Sometimes called "false" domes, corbel domes achieve their shape by extending each horizontal layer of stones inward slightly farther than the lower one until they meet at the top. A "false" dome may also refer to a wooden dome. The Italian use of the term finto, meaning "false", can be traced back to the 17th century in the use of vaulting made of reed mats and gypsum mortar. "True" domes are said to be those whose structure is in a state of compression, with constituent elements of wedge-shaped voussoirs, the joints of which align with a central point. The validity of this is unclear, as domes built underground with corbelled stone layers are in compression from the surrounding earth. Corbelled domes in Syria made of a spiral of earthen bricks bonded with earthen mortar may be better understood as a "monolithic" material behaving as membrane structures, rather than corbelled structures.

The precise definition of "pendentive" has also been a source of academic contention, such as whether or not corbelling is permitted under the definition and whether or not the lower portions of a sail vault should be considered pendentives. Domes with pendentives can be divided into two kinds: simple and compound. In the case of the simple dome, the pendentives are part of the same sphere as the dome itself; however, such domes are rare. In the case of the more common compound dome, the pendentives are part of the surface of a larger sphere below that of the dome itself and form a circular base for either the dome or a drum section.

The fields of engineering and architecture have lacked common language for domes, with engineering focused on structural behavior and architecture focused on form and symbolism. (Note: Palmisano & Totaro 2010, p. 519: "The absence of a common language is one of the reasons why nowadays there is a very big gap between the Architect and the Engineer. The introduction of new materials and techniques during the Industrial Revolution and the born of the first polytechnics in the 18th century, led to a different cultural approach to the design causing the born of different languages between Architects and Engineers. Nowadays, with the widespread of very complicated works of the architecture there is a huge need to bridge the gap between Architects and Engineers. In this context, focusing the attention on masonry domes, this paper aims at highlighting that Load Path Method seems to open new prospects in the search for a common language between engineers and architects to give voice, in harmony and in a single design, to formal, aesthetical, functional and structural aspects. According to LPM, a dome can be seen as a system of meridian arches joined by the parallel circles. The arches draw the paths of the vertical loads while the parallel circles draw the paths of the unbalanced thrusts. In fact, differently from the arches, in dome the equilibrium of the thrusts in every node is always possible because of the presence of the parallels.") (Note: Chilton 2000, p. 143: "Although the name 'dome' was appropriately applied (in the strict engineering sense) to historical long-span structures of synclastic form, working in compression and using heavy materials with little tensile strength, this is not correct for many of the new lightweight structural systems. However, the name 'dome' in common usage has come to refer to almost any long-span roofing system. The answer, therefore, to the question posed in the title of this paper is "It depends!". A synclastic surface acting predominantly in compression is clearly a dome by name, by form and by engineering definition, whilst a structure acting mainly in tension (such as the Georgia Dome) is a dome in name alone. Between these extremes there are many shades of distinction.") (Note: Jannasch 2016, pp. 745–746: "A funicular masonry dome experiences no hoop stresses, whether tensile or compressive, so it is always on the verge of bursting. Shallow spheric domes maintain compressive stresses in each course and are therefore more stable than the "ideal" funicular form. Viable non-funicular domes also include Herrero's flat vault at the Escorial, and Mackenzie's 1840 concept of an inverted fan vault." [...] "Masonry domes are often explained as free-standing arches rotated around a central axis, or as half-arches swept between a tension ring at the base and an ocular compression ring at the top. Such concepts aren't entirely inaccurate, but they are far from complete. They undervalue or ignore the circumferential compression in each course upon which the rising dome depends and which remains active in many completed structures. They also tend to ignore the vertical shear resistance that prevents inner and upper portions of the dome from crashing vertically down through outer and lower portions, and the horizontal shear resistance that allows lower parts of the dome to contain the thrust of upper parts. Visualizing the dome as a rotated arch implies that the bedding faces between subsequent courses of masonry need to be more or less normal to the section, which is the case in an arch, but not the case in a dome. Lastly, free-standing arches must be thick enough to contain their funicular. This is not true of domes. That the arch and funicular don't really explain of the structural behavior of domes should be clear from real world examples. The conical domes at Pisa and elsewhere, for example, the shallow domes of Byzantium, and the circular vaults at the Escorial are far from funicular. None of them would succeed if "un-rotated" into arches.") Additionally, new materials and structural systems in the 20th century have allowed for large dome-shaped structures that deviate from the traditional compressive structural behavior of masonry domes. Popular usage of the term has expanded to mean "almost any long-span roofing system".

== Elements ==
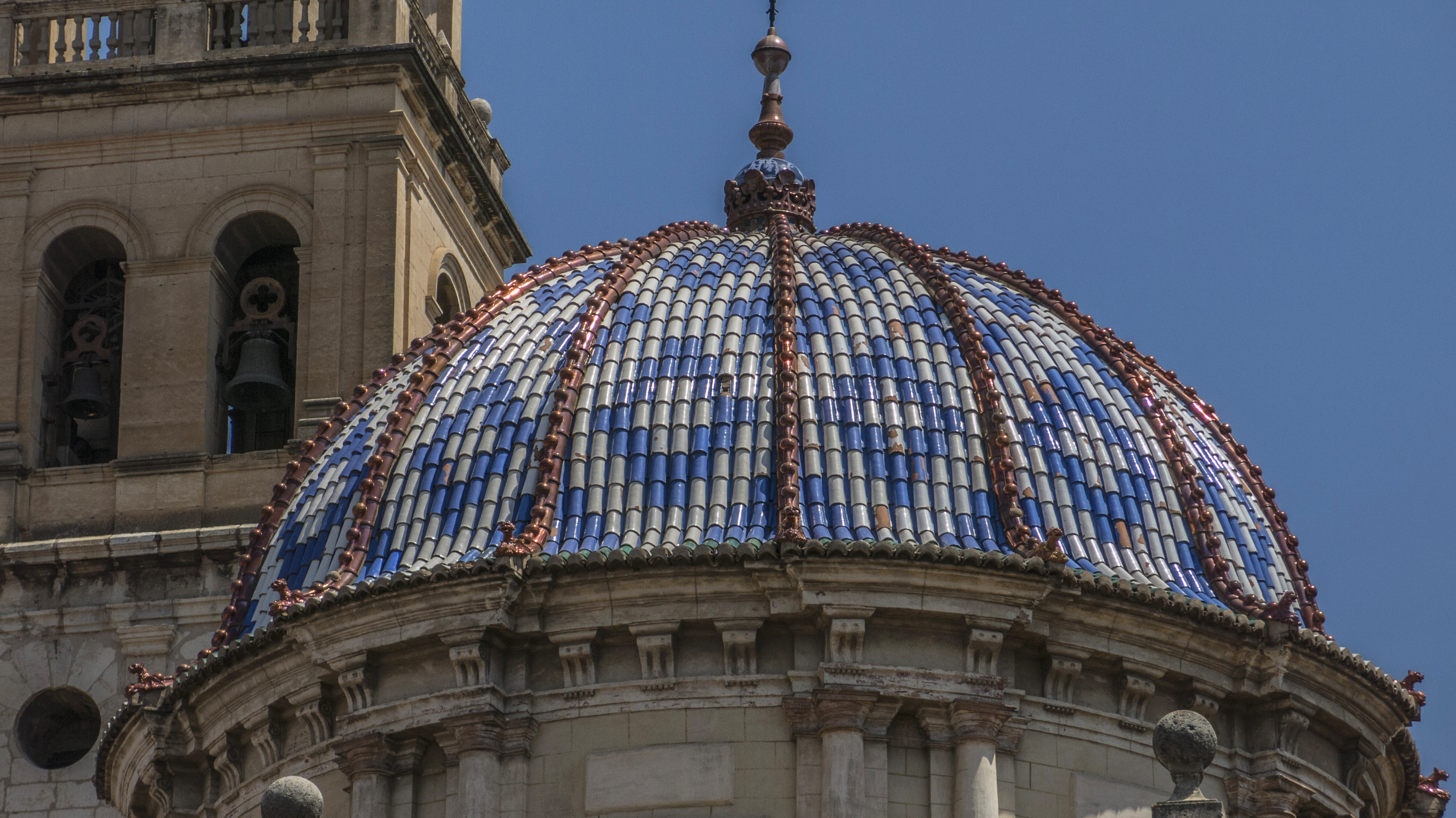
Dome of the Church of the Assumption in Carcaixent

The word "cupola" is another word for "dome", and is usually used for a small dome upon a roof or turret. "Cupola" has also been used to describe the inner side of a dome. The top of a dome is the "crown". The inner side of a dome is called the "intrados" and the outer side is called the "extrados". As with arches, the "springing" of a dome is the base level from which the dome rises and the "haunch" is the part that lies roughly halfway between the base and the top. Domes can be supported by an elliptical or circular wall called a "drum". If this structure extends to ground level, the round building may be called a "rotunda". Drums are also called "tholobates" and may or may not contain windows. A "tambour" or "lantern" is the equivalent structure over a dome's oculus, supporting a cupola.

When the base of the dome does not match the plan of the supporting walls beneath it (for example, a dome's circular base over a square bay), techniques are employed to bridge the two. The simplest technique is to use diagonal lintels across the corners of the walls to create an octagonal base. Another is to use arches to span the corners, which can support more weight.

A variety of these techniques use what are called "squinches". A squinch can be a single arch or a set of multiple projecting nested arches placed diagonally over an internal corner. Squinch forms also include trumpet arches, niche heads (or half-domes), trumpet arches with "anteposed" arches, and muqarnas arches. Squinches transfer the weight of a dome across the gaps created by the corners and into the walls.

Muqarnas (Arabic) or Mocárabe (Spanish) is a style found in Islamic architecture of dividing squinches into many smaller squinches in complex geometric arrangements. One technique is to use corbelling, progressively projecting horizontal layers from the top of the supporting wall to the base of the dome, such as the corbelled triangles often used in Seljuk and Ottoman architecture. Ottoman muqarnas were often made of stone and the carved horizontal courses support the ones above. Muqarnas in the Islamic west, the Maghreb and Andalusia, are made of wood or stucco and attached to the wall at the lowest tier only, forming vertical elements glued together. Eastern muqarnas are also based on half-pavilion vaults, whereas western muqarnas are based on half-groin vaults.

Pendentives are triangular sections of a sphere, like concave spandrels between arches, and transition from the corners of a square bay to the circular base of a dome. The curvature of the pendentives is that of a sphere with a diameter equal to the diagonal of the square bay. Pendentives concentrate the weight of a dome into the corners of the bay.

== Materials ==
The earliest domes in the Middle East were built with mud-brick and, eventually, with baked brick and stone. Domes of wood allowed for wide spans due to the relatively light and flexible nature of the material and were the normal method for domed churches by the 7th century, although most domes were built with the other less flexible materials. Wooden domes were protected from the weather by roofing, such as copper or lead sheeting. Domes of cut stone were more expensive and never as large, and timber was used for large spans where brick was unavailable.

Roman concrete used an aggregate of stone with a powerful mortar. The aggregate transitioned over the centuries to pieces of fired clay, then to Roman bricks. By the sixth century, bricks with large amounts of mortar were the principle vaulting materials. Pozzolana appears to have only been used in central Italy. Brick domes were the favored choice for large-space monumental coverings until the Industrial Age, due to their convenience and dependability. Ties and chains of iron or wood could be used to resist stresses.

In the Middle East and Central Asia, domes and drums constructed from mud brick and baked brick were sometimes covered with brittle ceramic tiles on the exterior to protect against rain and snow.

The new building materials of the 19th century and a better understanding of the forces within structures from the 20th century opened up new possibilities. Iron and steel beams, steel cables, and pre-stressed concrete eliminated the need for external buttressing and enabled much thinner domes. Whereas earlier masonry domes may have had a radius to thickness ratio of 50, the ratio for modern domes can be in excess of 800. The lighter weight of these domes not only permitted far greater spans, but also allowed for the creation of large movable domes over modern sports stadiums.

Experimental rammed earth domes were made as part of work on sustainable architecture at the University of Kassel in 1983.

== Shapes and internal forces ==
A masonry dome produces thrusts downward and outward. They are described as two kinds of forces at right angles to one another: meridional forces (like the meridians, or lines of longitude, on a globe) are compressive only, and increase towards the base, while hoop forces (like the lines of latitude on a globe) are in compression at the top and tension at the base, with the transition in a hemispherical dome occurring at an angle of 51.8 degrees from the top. The thrusts generated by a dome are directly proportional to the weight of its materials.

When hoop forces at the base of a masonry dome exceed the tensile strength of the dome, vertical cracks develop that make the dome act as a series of concentric wedge-shaped arches that do not necessarily compromise the overall structure. Although some cracking along the meridians is natural, excessive outward thrusts in the lower portion of a hemispherical masonry dome can be counteracted with the use of chains incorporated around the circumference or with external buttressing. Grounded hemispherical domes can still generate significant horizontal thrusts at their haunches. For small or tall domes with less horizontal thrust, the thickness of the supporting arches or walls can be enough to resist deformation, which is why drums tend to be much thicker than the domes they support.

Meridian forces can cause dangerous horizontal cracking when not enclosed in the structure. When such compression is focused on an inside surface, for example, the corresponding outside surface will be in tension and crack, with the inside surface acting as a hinge in a potential collapse.

Unlike voussoir arches, which require support for each element until the keystone is in place, domes are stable during construction as each level is made a complete and self-supporting ring. The upper portion of a masonry dome is always in compression and is supported laterally, so it does not collapse except as a whole unit and a range of deviations from the ideal in this shallow upper cap are equally stable. Because voussoir domes have lateral support, they can be made much thinner than corresponding arches of the same span. For example, a hemispherical dome can be 2.5 times thinner than a semicircular arch, and a dome with the profile of an equilateral arch can be thinner still.

The optimal shape for a masonry dome of equal thickness provides for perfect compression, with none of the tension or bending forces against which masonry is weak. For a particular material, the optimal dome geometry is called the funicular surface, the comparable shape in three dimensions to a catenary curve for a two-dimensional arch. The safe theorem (in the formulation of Jacques Heyman) states that when a thrust line is located within the wall of an arch it is in equilibrium and the arch is stable for a given load. Adding a weight to the top of a pointed dome, such as the heavy cupola at the top of Florence Cathedral, changes the optimal shape to more closely match the actual pointed shape of the dome. The pointed profiles of many Gothic domes more closely approximate the optimal dome shape than do hemispheres, which were favored by Roman and Byzantine architects due to the circle being considered the most perfect of forms.

== Symbolism ==
According to E. Baldwin Smith, from the late Stone Age the dome-shaped tomb was used as a reproduction of the ancestral, god-given shelter made permanent as a venerated home of the dead. The instinctive desire to do this resulted in widespread domical mortuary traditions across the ancient world, from the stupas of India to the tholos tombs of Iberia. By Hellenistic and Roman times, the domical tholos had become the customary cemetery symbol.

Domes and tent-canopies were also associated with the heavens in Ancient Persia and the Hellenistic-Roman world. A dome over a square base reflected the geometric symbolism of those shapes. The circle represented perfection, eternity, and the heavens. The square represented the earth. An octagon was intermediate between the two. The distinct symbolism of the heavenly or cosmic tent stemming from the royal audience tents of Achaemenid and Indian rulers was adopted by Roman rulers in imitation of Alexander the Great, becoming the imperial baldachin. This probably began with Nero, whose "Golden House" also made the dome a feature of palace architecture.

The dual sepulchral and heavenly symbolism was adopted by early Christians in both the use of domes in architecture and in the ciborium, a domical canopy like the baldachin used as a ritual covering for relics or the church altar. The celestial symbolism of the dome, however, was the preeminent one by the Christian era. In the early centuries of Islam, domes were closely associated with royalty. A dome built in front of the mihrab of a mosque, for example, was at least initially meant to emphasize the place of a prince during royal ceremonies. Over time such domes became primarily focal points for decoration or the direction of prayer. The use of domes in mausoleums can likewise reflect royal patronage or be seen as representing the honor and prestige that domes symbolized, rather than having any specific funerary meaning. The wide variety of dome forms in medieval Islam reflected dynastic, religious, and social differences as much as practical building considerations.

== Acoustics ==
Because domes are concave from below, they can reflect sound and create echoes. A dome may have a "whispering gallery" at its base that at certain places transmits distinct sound to other distant places in the gallery. The half-domes over the apses of Byzantine churches helped to project the chants of the clergy. Although this can complement music, it may make speech less intelligible, leading Francesco Giorgi in 1535 to recommend vaulted ceilings for the choir areas of a church, but a flat ceiling filled with as many coffers as possible for where preaching would occur. Disagreeing with his contemporaries, Vincenzo Scamozzi asserted in 1615 that dome vaulting assists acoustics, provided that the walls and other surfaces are "broken up as much as possible by cornices (preferably two superimposed orders), openings, cofferings, cavities, reliefs, and pilasters."

Cavities in the form of jars built into the inner surface of a dome may serve to compensate for interference by diffusing sound in all directions, eliminating echoes while creating a "divine effect in the atmosphere of worship." This technique was written about by Vitruvius in his Ten Books on Architecture, which describes bronze and earthenware resonators. The material, shape, contents, and placement of these cavity resonators determine the effect they have: reinforcing certain frequencies or absorbing them.

== Types ==
=== Beehive dome ===
Also called a corbelled dome, cribbed dome, or false dome, these are different from a 'true dome' in that they consist of purely horizontal layers. As the layers get higher, each is slightly cantilevered, or corbeled, toward the center until meeting at the top. A monumental example is the Mycenaean Treasury of Atreus from the late Bronze Age.

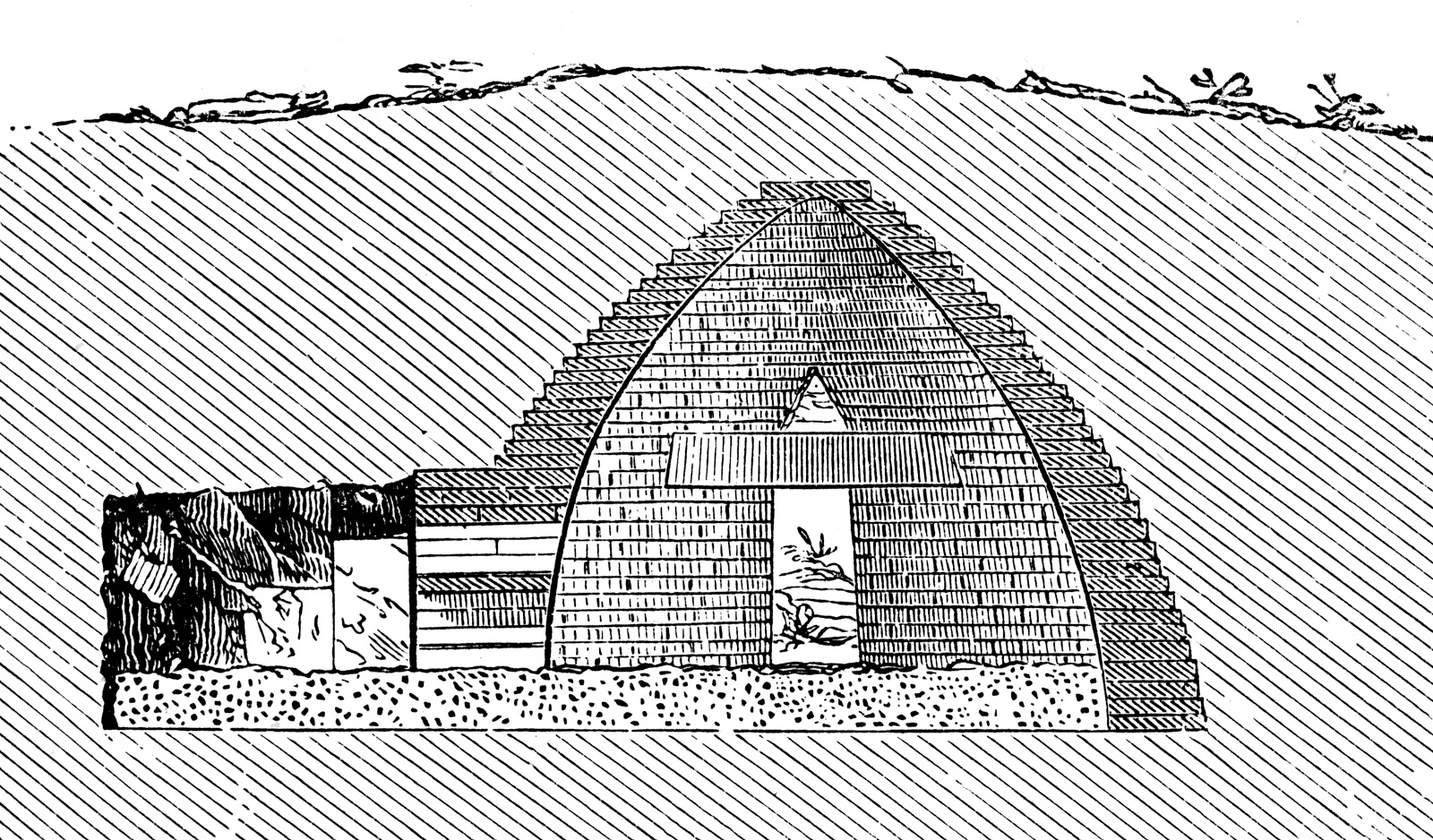
Drawing of the Treasury of Atreus

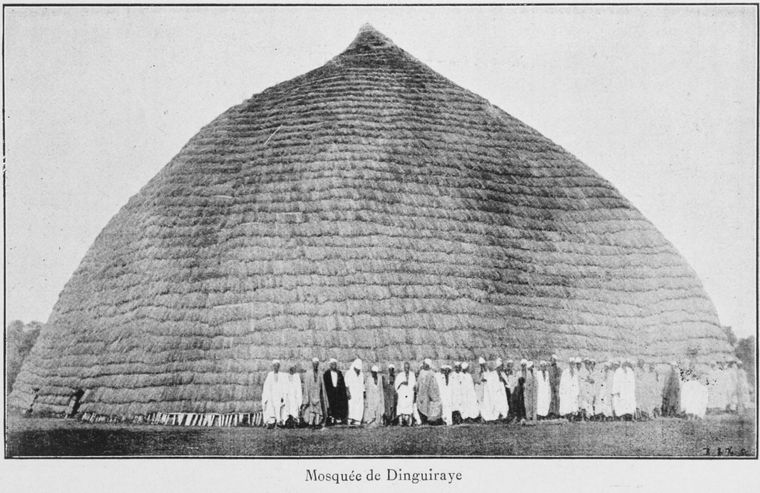
Mosque of Dinguiraye, Guinea, ca. 1900

=== Braced dome ===
A single or double layer space frame in the form of a dome, a braced dome is a generic term that includes ribbed, Schwedler, three-way grid, lamella or Kiewitt, lattice, and geodesic domes. The different terms reflect different arrangements in the surface members. Braced domes often have a very low weight and are usually used to cover spans of up to 150 meters. Often prefabricated, their component members can either lie on the dome's surface of revolution, or be straight lengths with the connecting points or nodes lying upon the surface of revolution. Single-layer structures are called frame or skeleton types and double-layer structures are truss types, which are used for large spans. When the covering also forms part of the structural system, it is called a stressed skin type. The formed surface type consists of sheets joined at bent edges to form the structure.

=== Bulbous or onion dome ===
Bulbous domes bulge out beyond their base diameters, offering a profile greater than a hemisphere. An onion dome is a greater than hemispherical dome with a pointed top in an ogee profile. They are found in the Near East, Middle East, Persia, and India and may not have had a single point of origin. Their appearance in northern Russian architecture predates the Tatar occupation of Russia and so is not easily explained as the result of that influence. They became popular in the second half of the 15th century in the Low Countries of Northern Europe, possibly inspired by the finials of minarets in Egypt and Syria, and developed in the 16th and 17th centuries in the Netherlands before spreading to Germany, becoming a popular element of the baroque architecture of Central Europe. German bulbous domes were also influenced by Russian and Eastern European domes. The examples found in various European architectural styles are typically wooden. Examples include Kazan Church in Kolomenskoye and the Brighton Pavilion by John Nash. In Islamic architecture, they are typically made of masonry, rather than timber, with the thick and heavy bulging portion serving to buttress against the tendency of masonry domes to spread at their bases. The Taj Mahal is a famous example.

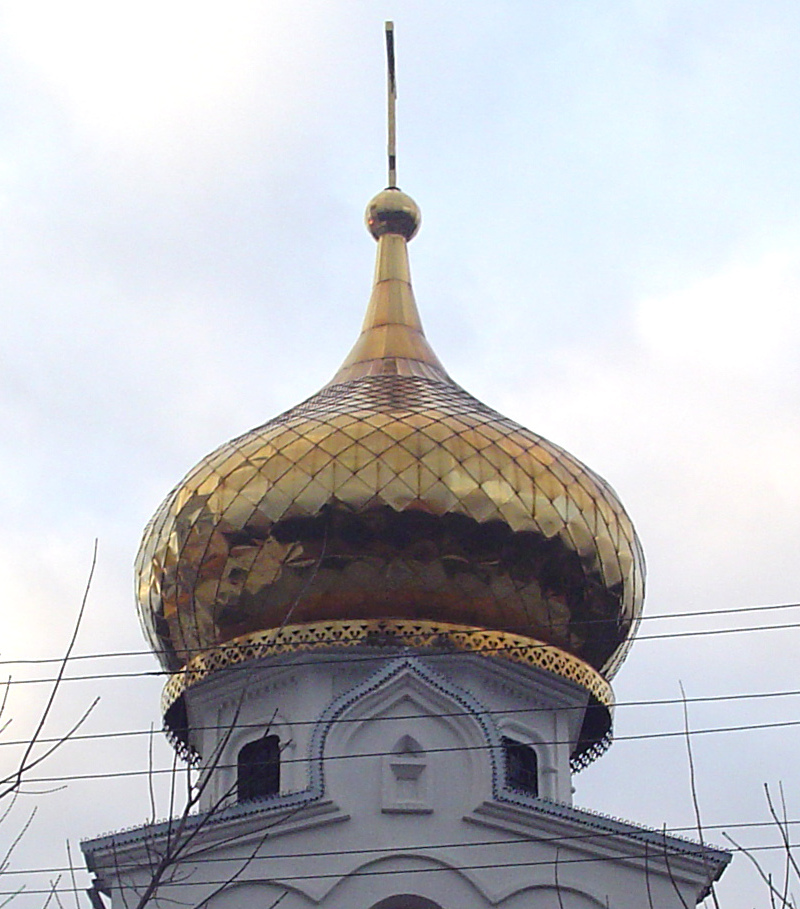
Onion dome in Russia

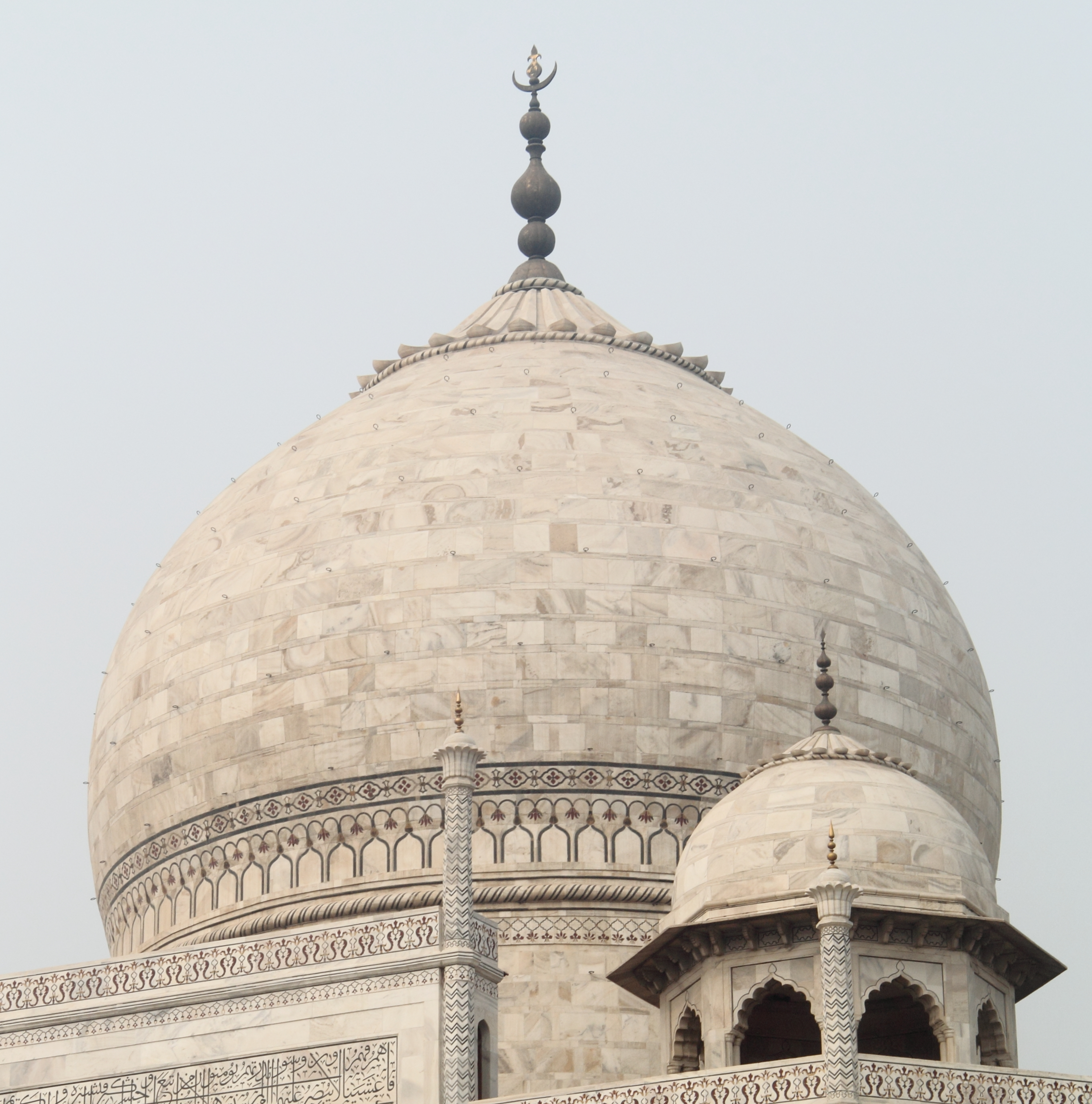
Bulbous dome of the Taj Mahal

Bulbous dome in Austria

=== Cloister vault ===
Also called domical vaults (a term sometimes also applied to sail vaults), polygonal domes, coved domes, gored domes, segmental domes (a term sometimes also used for saucer domes), paneled vaults, or pavilion vaults, these are domes that maintain a polygonal shape in their horizontal cross section. The component curved surfaces of these vaults are called severies, webs, or cells. The earliest known examples date to the first century BC, such as the Tabularium of Rome from 78 BC. Others include the Baths of Antoninus in Carthage (145–160) and the Palatine Chapel at Aachen (13th – 14th century). The most famous example is the Renaissance octagonal dome of Filippo Brunelleschi over the Florence Cathedral. Thomas Jefferson, the third president of the United States, installed an octagonal dome above the West front of his plantation house, Monticello.

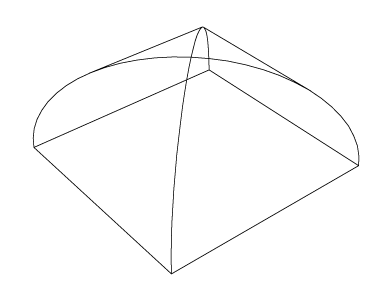
Drawing of a square cloister vault

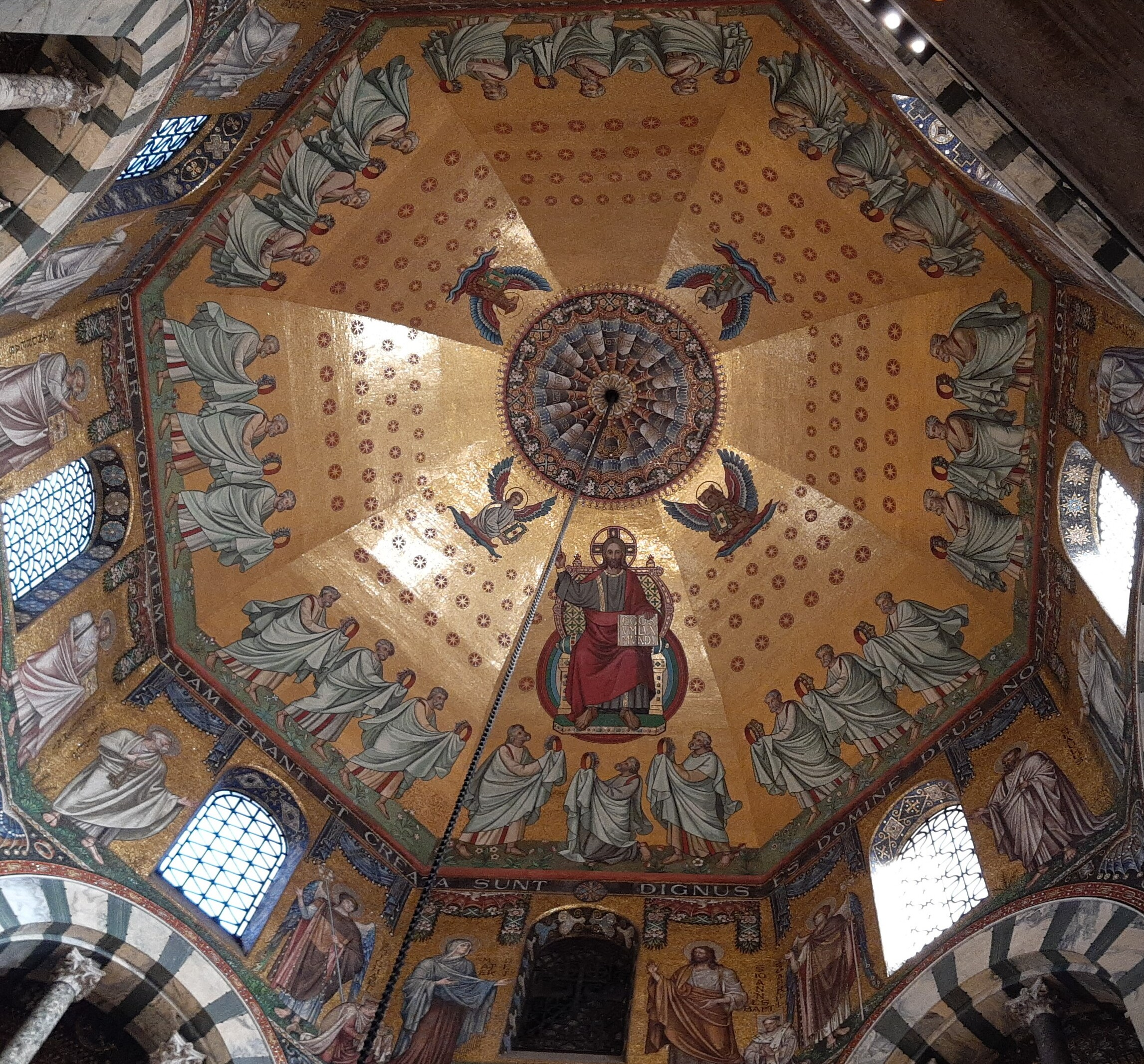
Octagonal cloister vault at Aachen Cathedral

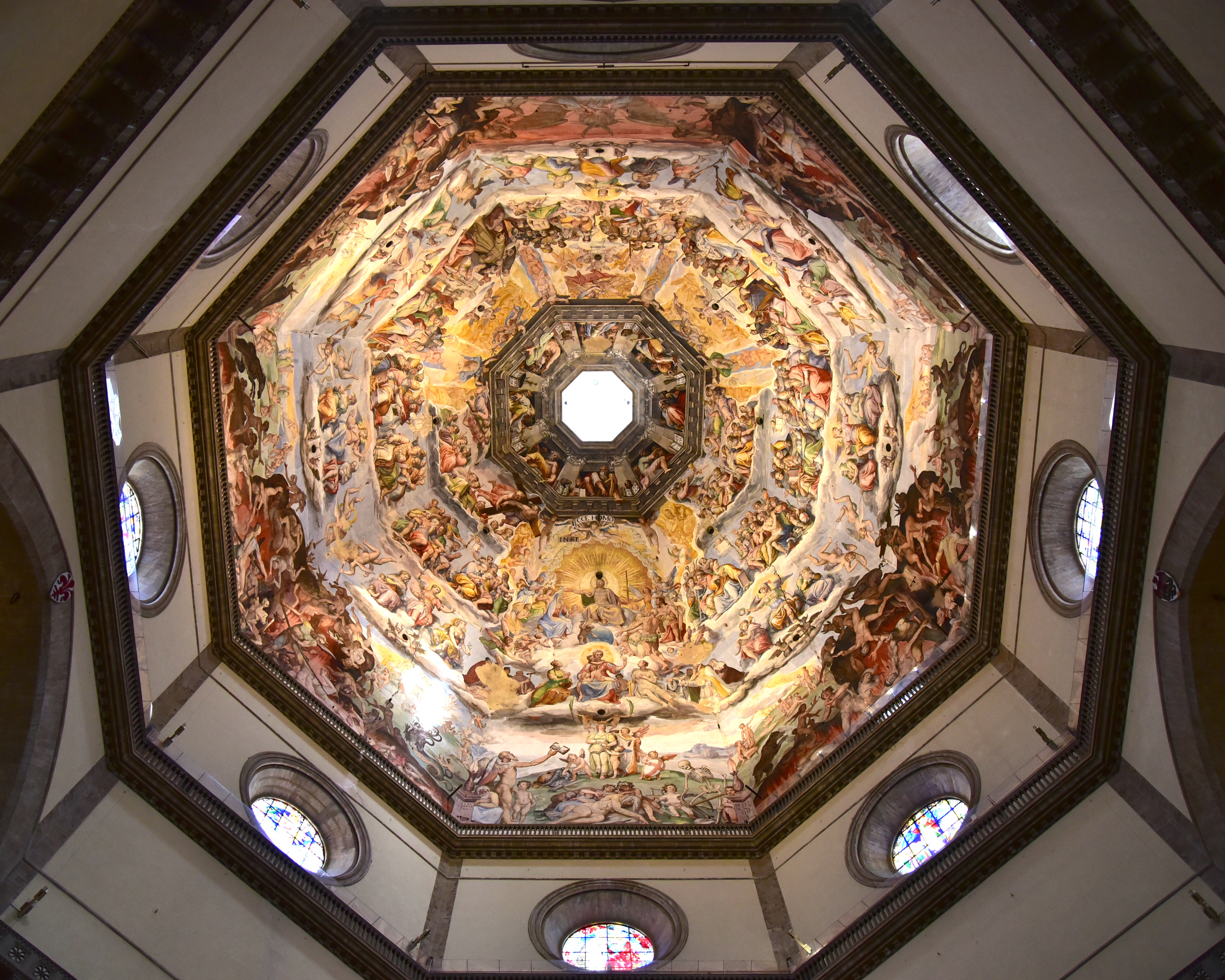
Octagonal dome of Florence Cathedral

=== Compound dome ===
Also called domes on pendentives or pendentive domes (a term also applied to sail vaults), compound domes have pendentives that support a smaller diameter dome immediately above them, as in the Hagia Sophia, or a drum and dome, as in many Renaissance and post-Renaissance domes, with both forms resulting in greater height.

Drawing of a compound dome

=== Crossed-arch dome ===
One of the earliest types of ribbed vault, the first known examples are found in the Great Mosque of Córdoba in the 10th century. Rather than meeting in the center of the dome, the ribs characteristically intersect one another off-center, forming an empty polygonal space in the center. Geometry is a key element of the designs, with the octagon being perhaps the most popular shape used. Whether the arches are structural or purely decorative remains a matter of debate. The type may have an eastern origin, although the issue is also unsettled. Examples are found in Spain, North Africa, Armenia, Iran, France, and Italy.

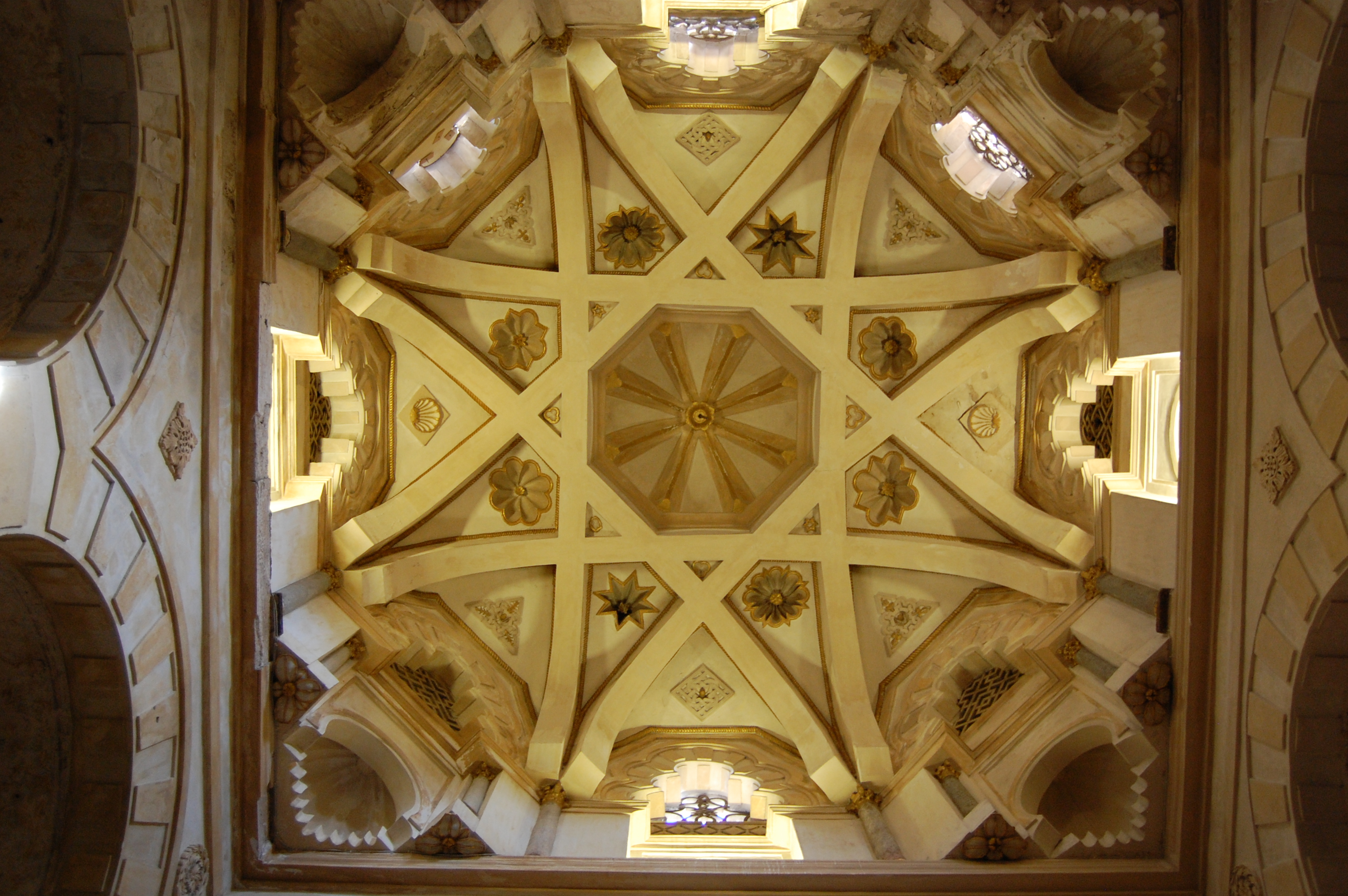
A crossed-arch dome at the Mosque–Cathedral of Córdoba

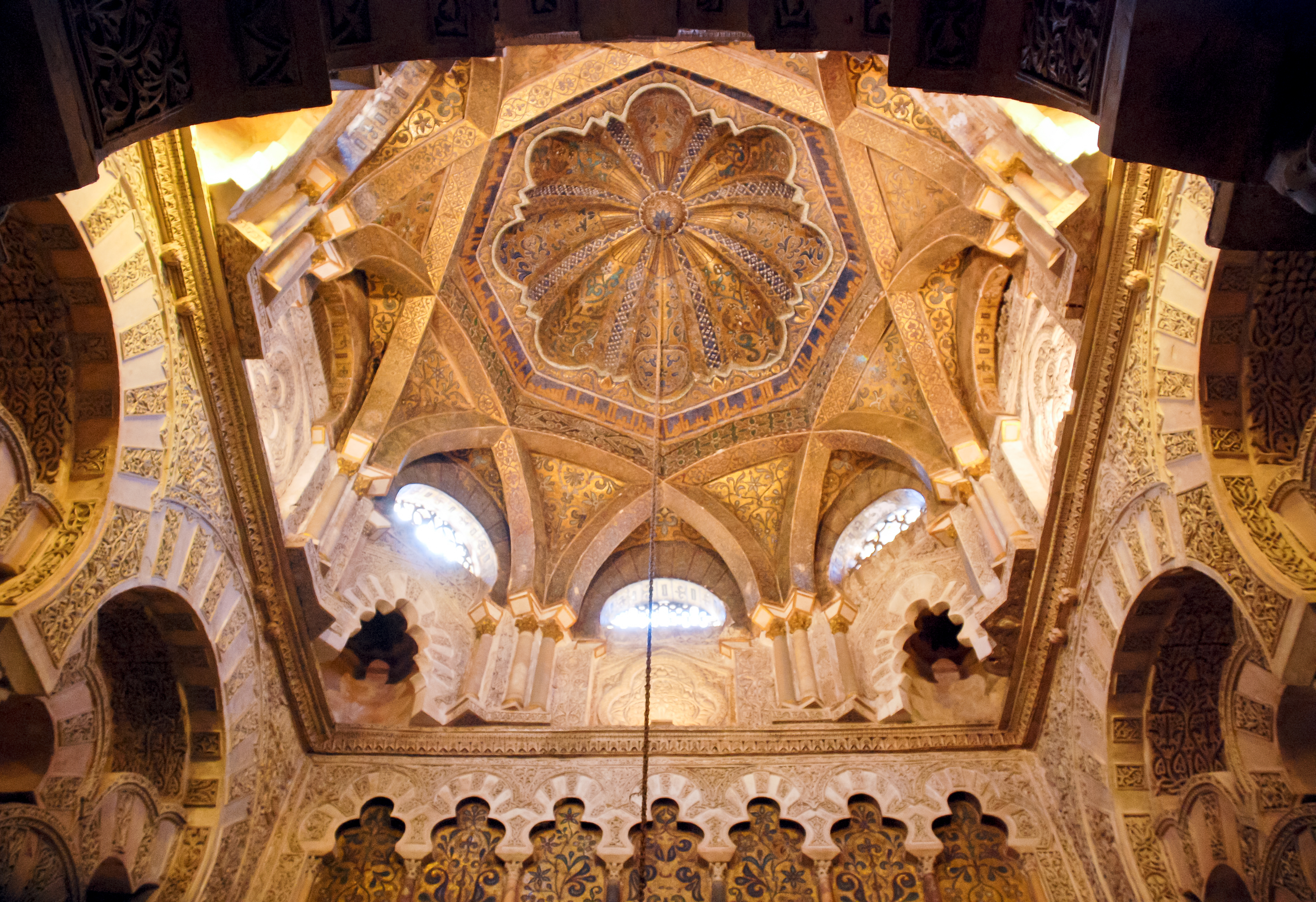
A crossed-arch dome at the Mosque–Cathedral of Córdoba

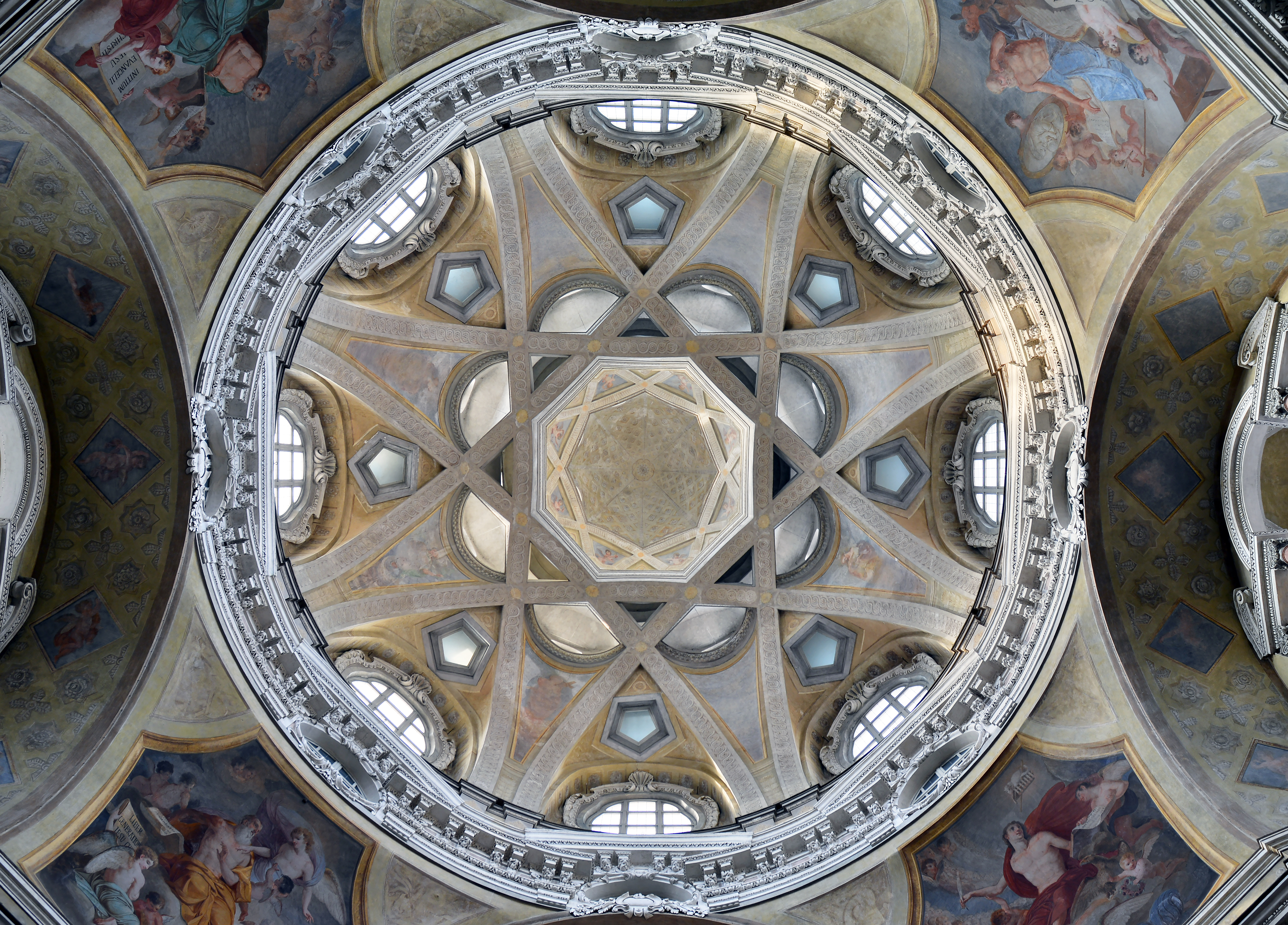
The Church of San Lorenzo in Turin, Italy

=== Ellipsoidal dome ===
The ellipsoidal dome is a surface formed by the rotation around a vertical axis of a semi-ellipse. Like other "rotational domes" formed by the rotation of a curve around a vertical axis, ellipsoidal domes have circular bases and horizontal sections and are a type of "circular dome" for that reason.

=== Geodesic dome ===
Geodesic domes are the upper portion of geodesic spheres. They are composed of a framework of triangles in a polyhedron pattern. The structures are named for geodesics and are based upon geometric shapes such as icosahedrons, octahedrons or tetrahedrons. Such domes can be created using a limited number of simple elements and joints and efficiently resolve a dome's internal forces. Their efficiency is said to increase with size. Although not first invented by Buckminster Fuller, they are associated with him because he designed many geodesic domes and patented them in the United States.

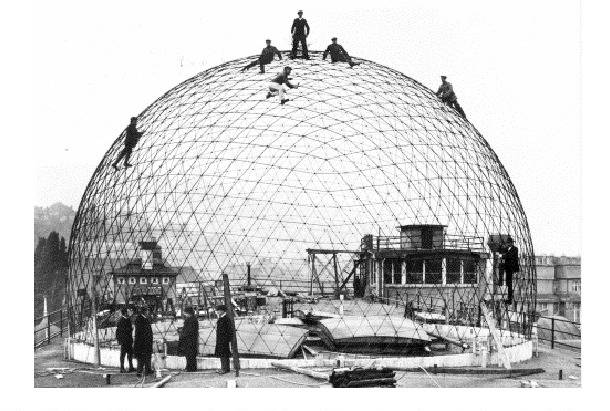
Geodesic dome in Jena, Germany

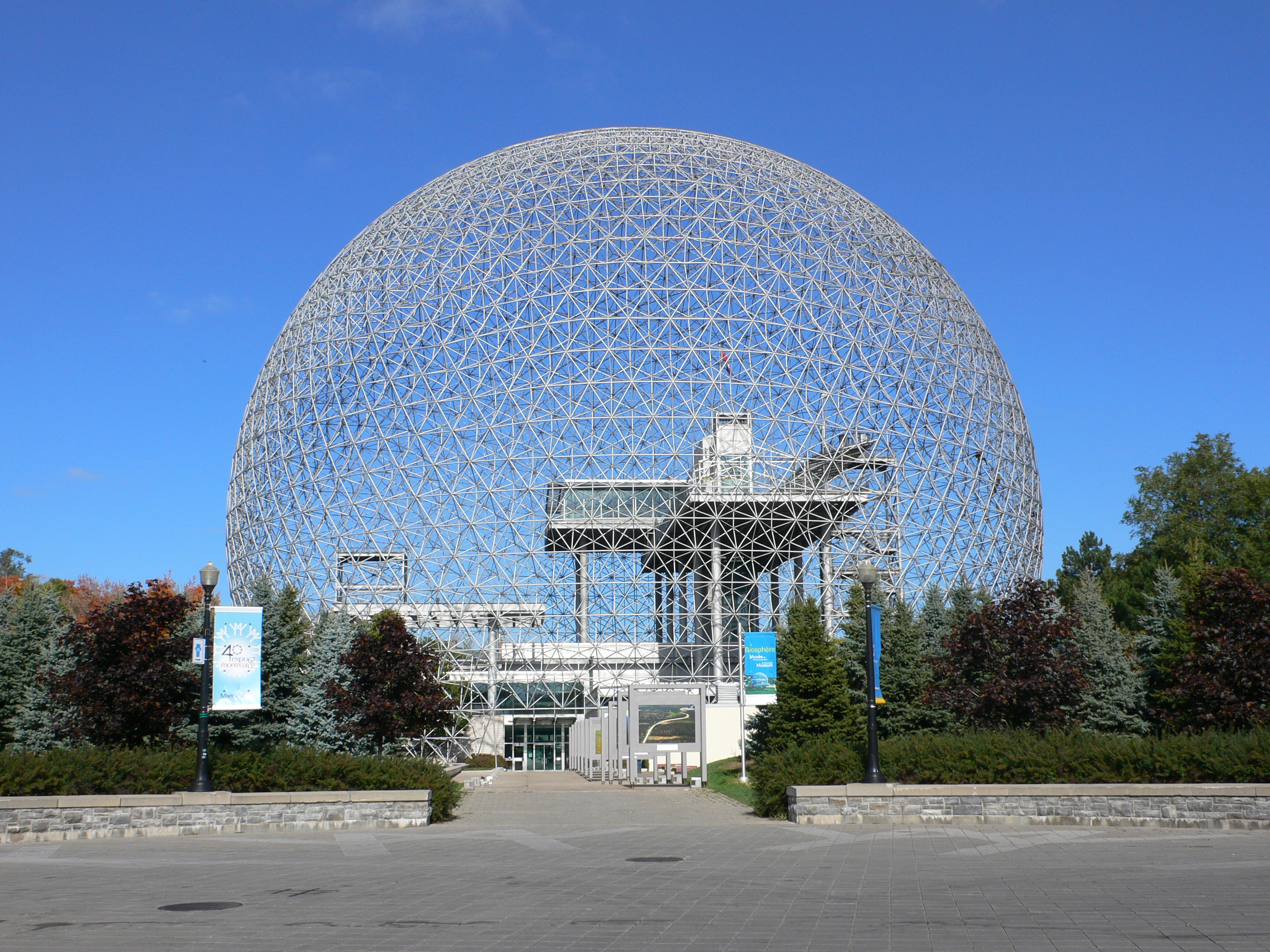
Geodesic dome of the Montreal Biosphere

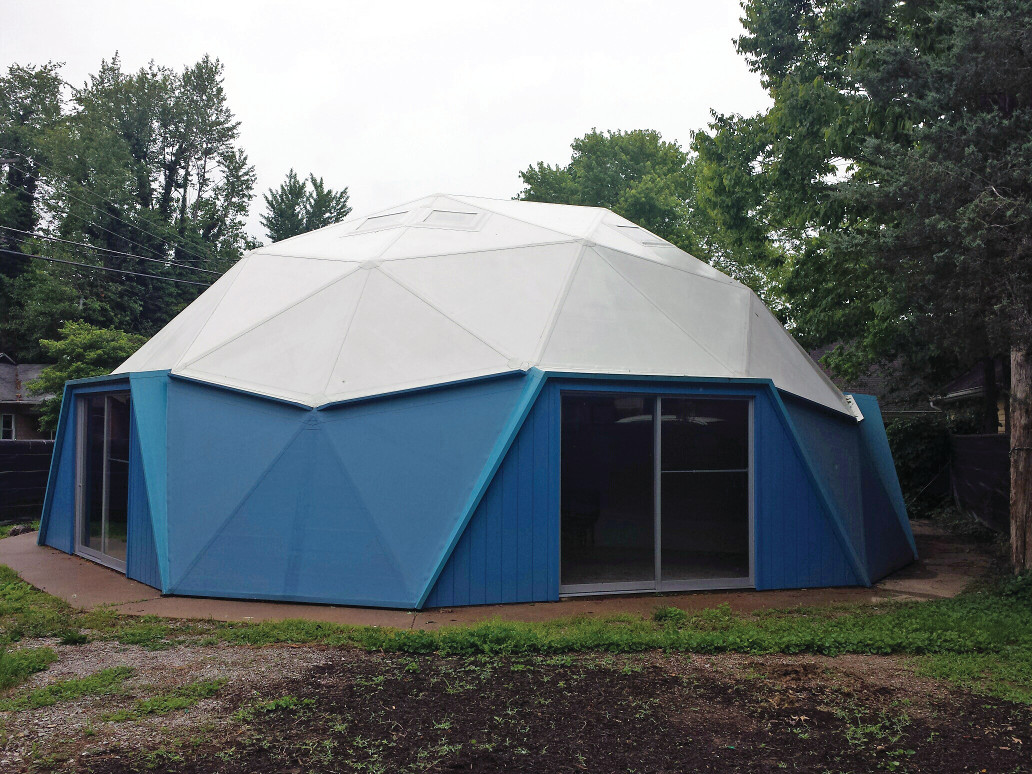
Geodesic dome home

=== Hemispherical dome ===
The hemispherical dome is a surface formed by the rotation around a vertical axis of a semicircle. Like other "rotational domes" formed by the rotation of a curve around a vertical axis, hemispherical domes have circular bases and horizontal sections and are a type of "circular dome" for that reason. They experience vertical compression along their meridians, but horizontally experience compression only in the portion above 51.8 degrees from the top. Below this point, hemispherical domes experience tension horizontally, and usually require buttressing to counteract it. According to E. Baldwin Smith, it was a shape likely known to the Assyrians, defined by Greek theoretical mathematicians, and standardized by Roman builders.

Drawing of a hemispherical dome on a drum

=== Oval dome ===
An oval dome is a dome of oval shape in plan, profile, or both. The term comes from the Latin ovum, meaning "egg". The earliest oval domes were used by convenience in corbelled stone huts as rounded but geometrically undefined coverings, and the first examples in Asia Minor date to around 4000 B.C. The geometry was eventually defined using combinations of circular arcs, transitioning at points of tangency. If the Romans created oval domes, it was only in exceptional circumstances. The Roman foundations of the oval plan Church of St. Gereon in Cologne point to a possible example. Domes in the Middle Ages also tended to be circular, though the church of Santo Tomás de las Ollas in Spain has an oval dome over its oval plan. Other examples of medieval oval domes can be found covering rectangular bays in churches. Oval plan churches became a type in the Renaissance and popular in the Baroque style. The dome built for the basilica of Vicoforte by Francesco Gallo was one of the largest and most complex ever made. Although the ellipse was known, in practice, domes of this shape were created by combining segments of circles. Popular in the 16th and 17th centuries, oval and elliptical plan domes can vary their dimensions in three axes or two axes. A sub-type with the long axis having a semicircular section is called a Murcia dome, as in the Chapel of the Junterones at Murcia Cathedral. When the short axis has a semicircular section, it is called a Melon dome.

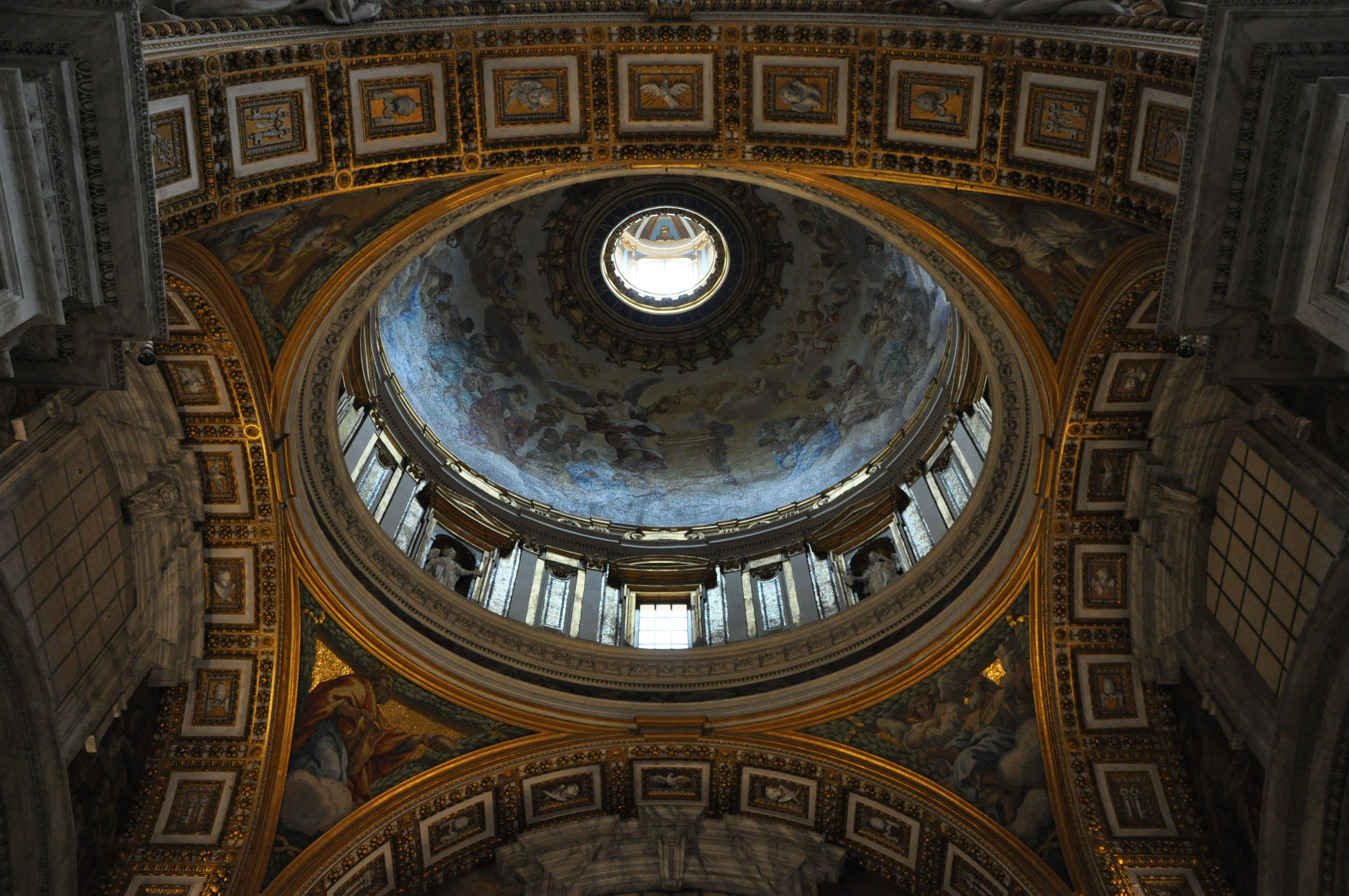
An oval dome at St. Peter's Basilica

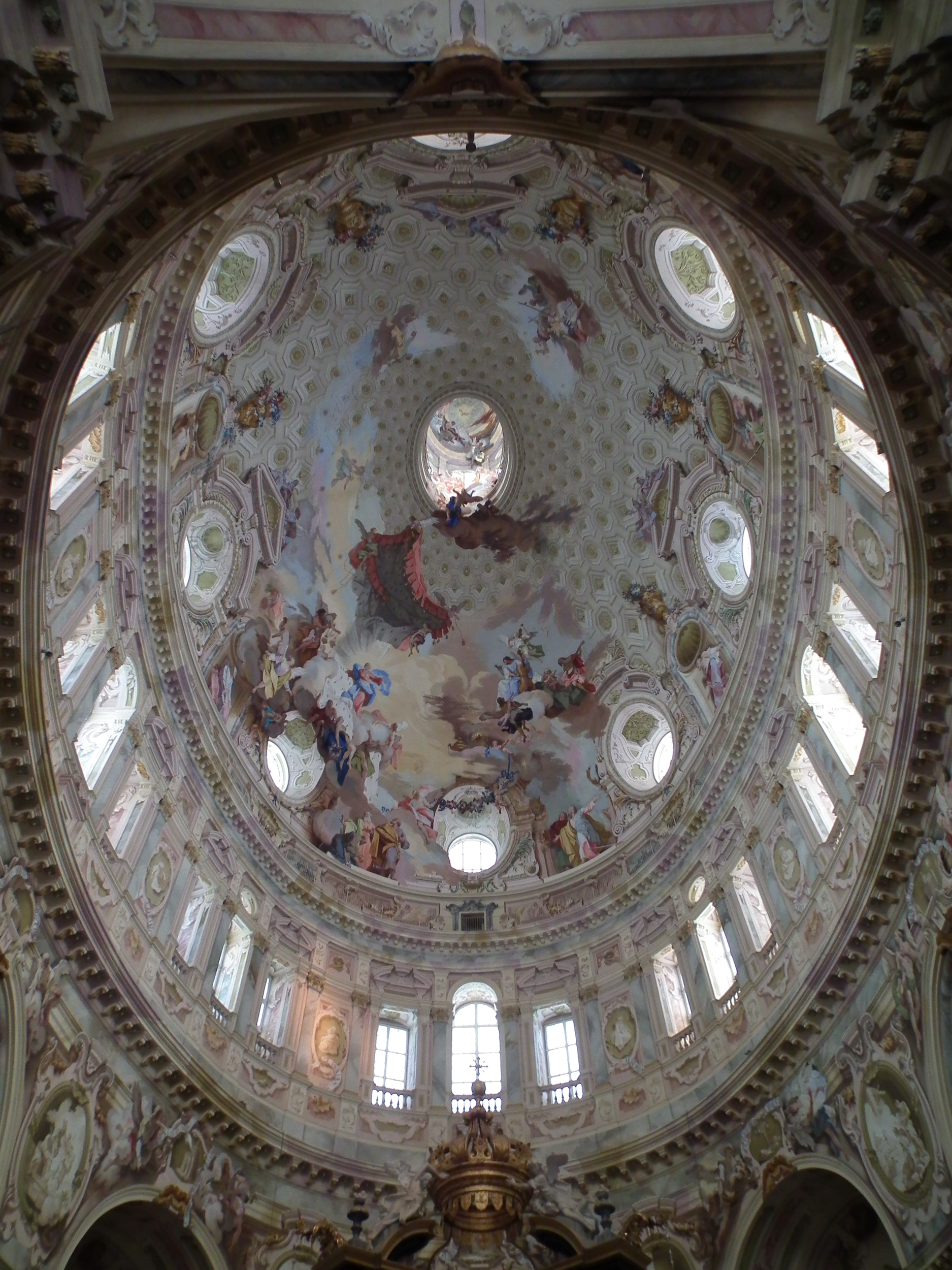
The oval dome of the Sanctuary of Vicoforte

=== Paraboloid dome ===
A paraboloid dome is a surface formed by the rotation around a vertical axis of a sector of a parabola. Like other "rotational domes" formed by the rotation of a curve around a vertical axis, paraboloid domes have circular bases and horizontal sections and are a type of "circular dome" for that reason. Because of their shape, paraboloid domes experience only compression, both radially and horizontally.

=== Sail dome ===
Also called sail vaults, handkerchief vaults, domical vaults (a term sometimes also applied to cloister vaults), pendentive domes (a term that has also been applied to compound domes), Bohemian vaults, or Byzantine domes, this type can be thought of as pendentives that, rather than merely touching each other to form a circular base for a drum or compound dome, smoothly continue their curvature to form the dome itself. The dome gives the impression of a square sail pinned down at each corner and billowing upward. These can also be thought of as saucer domes upon pendentives. Sail domes are based upon the shape of a hemisphere and are not to be confused with elliptic parabolic vaults, which appear similar but have different characteristics. In addition to semicircular sail vaults there are variations in geometry such as a low rise to span ratio or covering a rectangular plan. Sail vaults of all types have a variety of thrust conditions along their borders, which can cause problems, but have been widely used from at least the sixteenth century. The second floor of the Llotja de la Seda is covered by a series of nine meter wide sail vaults.

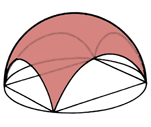
Drawing of a sail dome

=== Saucer dome ===
Also called segmental domes (a term sometimes also used for cloister vaults), or calottes, these have profiles of less than half a circle. Because they reduce the portion of the dome in tension, these domes are strong but have increased radial thrust. Many of the largest existing domes are of this shape.

Masonry saucer domes, because they exist entirely in compression, can be built much thinner than other dome shapes without becoming unstable. The trade-off between the proportionately increased horizontal thrust at their abutments and their decreased weight and quantity of materials may make them more economical, but they are more vulnerable to damage from movement in their supports.

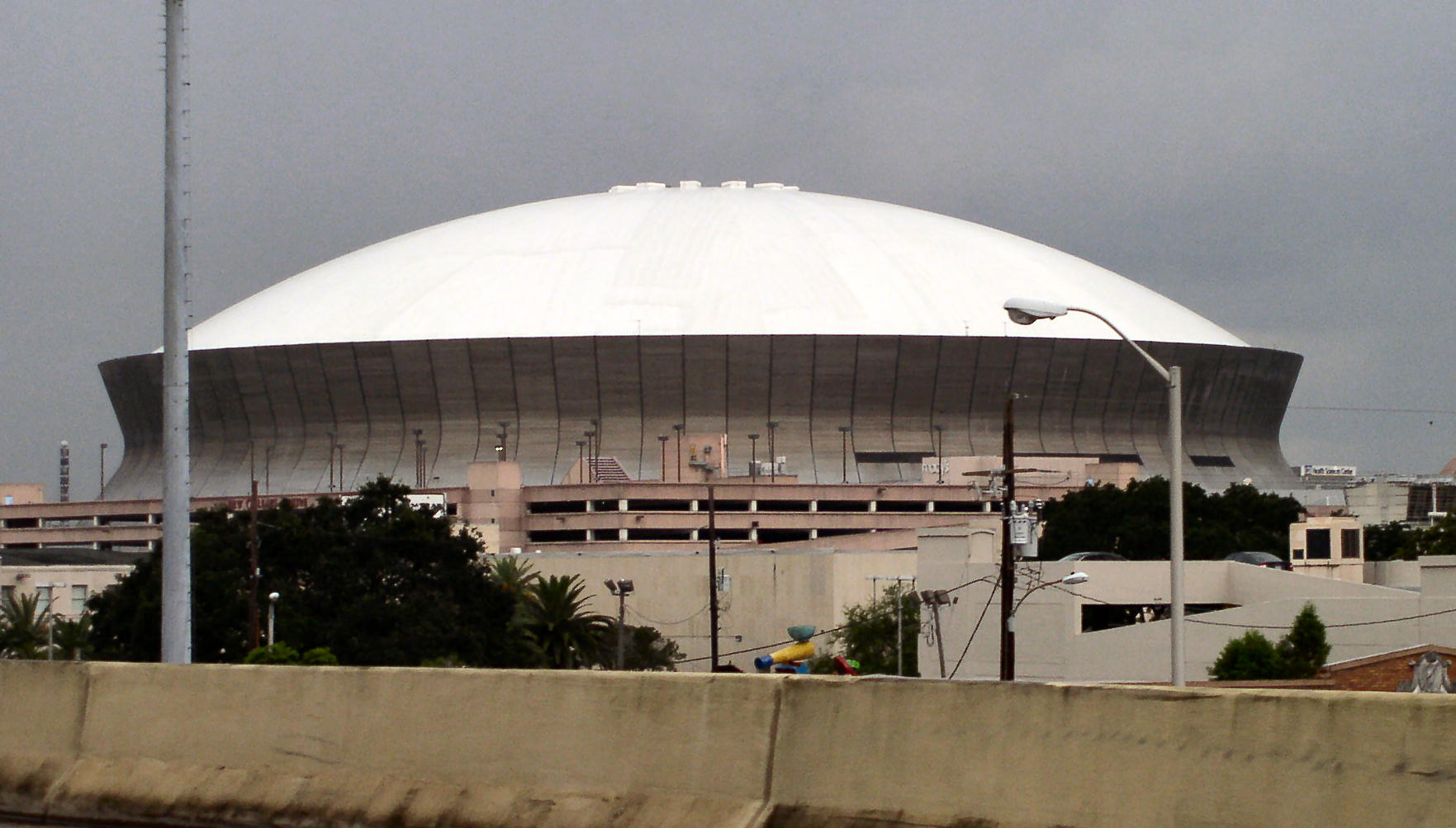
Saucer dome (Louisiana Superdome, Louisiana, US)

=== Umbrella dome ===
Also called gored, shell, gadrooned, fluted, organ-piped, pumpkin, melon, ribbed, parachute, scalloped, or lobed domes, these are a type of dome divided at the base into curved segments, which follow the curve of the elevation. They were common in the Roman era. "Fluted" may refer specifically to this pattern as an external feature, such as was common in Mamluk Egypt. The "ribs" of a dome are the radial lines of masonry that extend from the crown down to the springing. The central dome of the Hagia Sophia uses the ribbed method, which accommodates a ring of windows between the ribs at the base of the dome. The central dome of St. Peter's Basilica also uses this method.

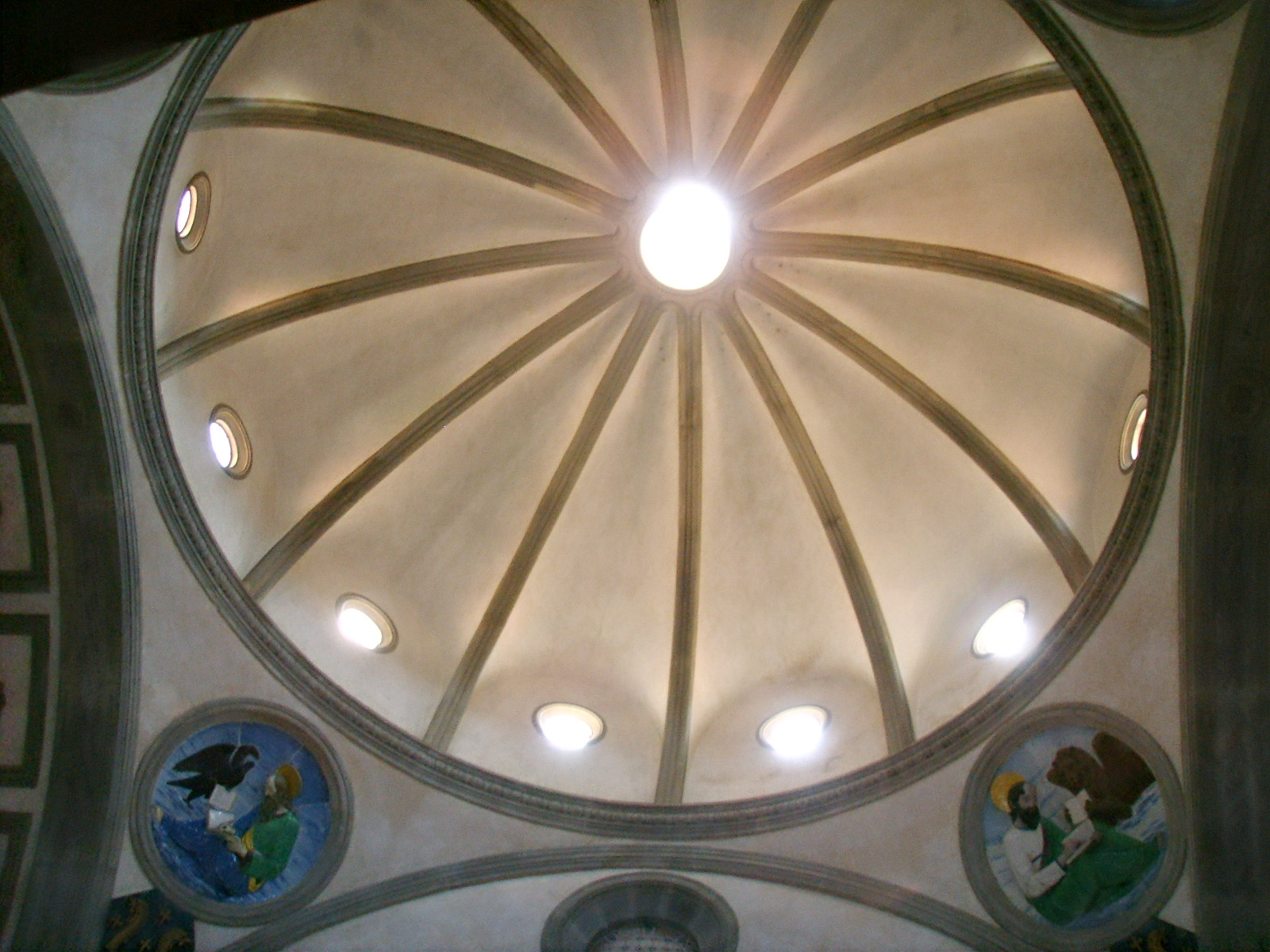
An umbrella dome at Santa Croce, Florence

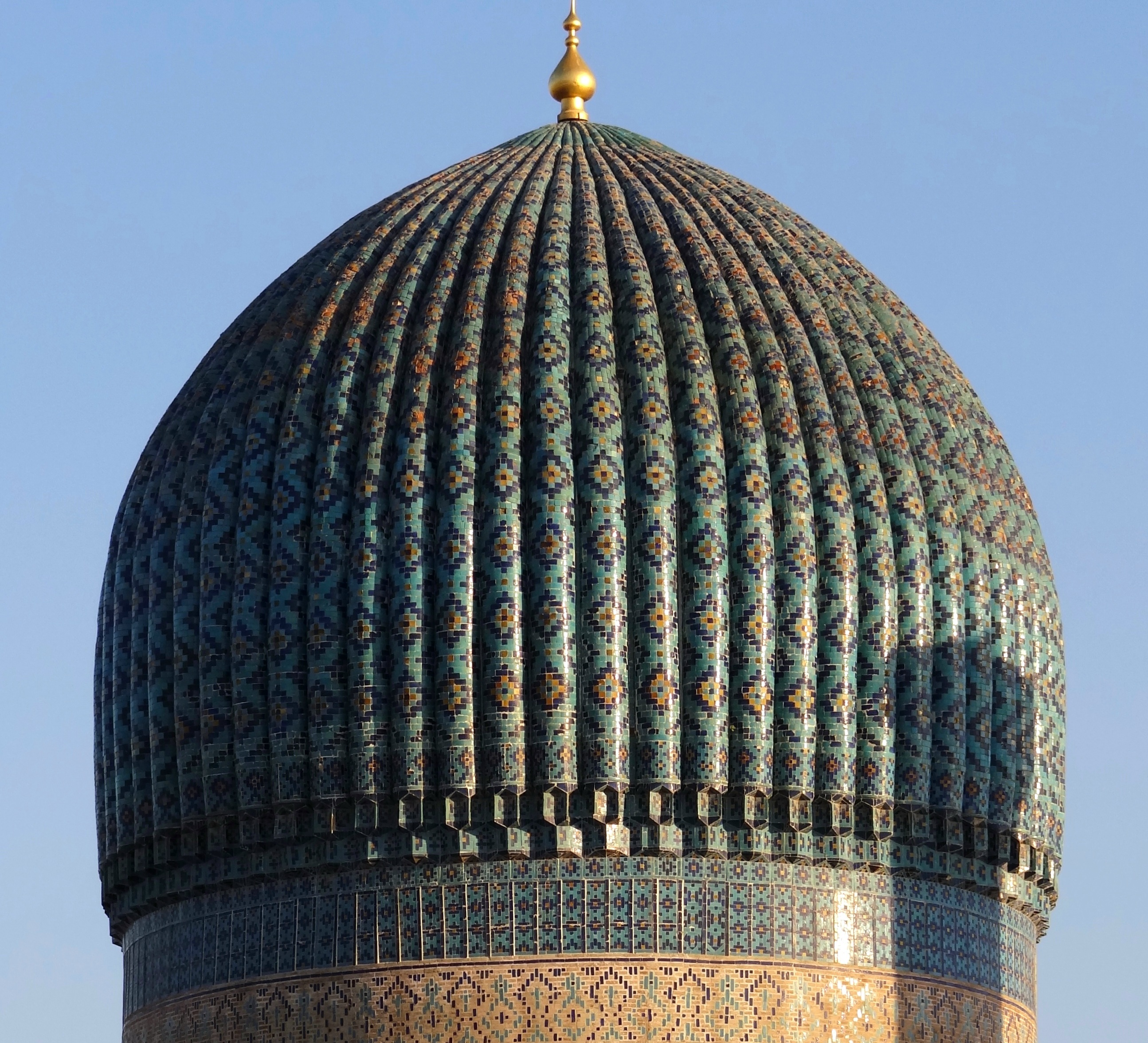
A fluted dome at Gur-e-Amir

== History ==
=== Early history and simple domes ===
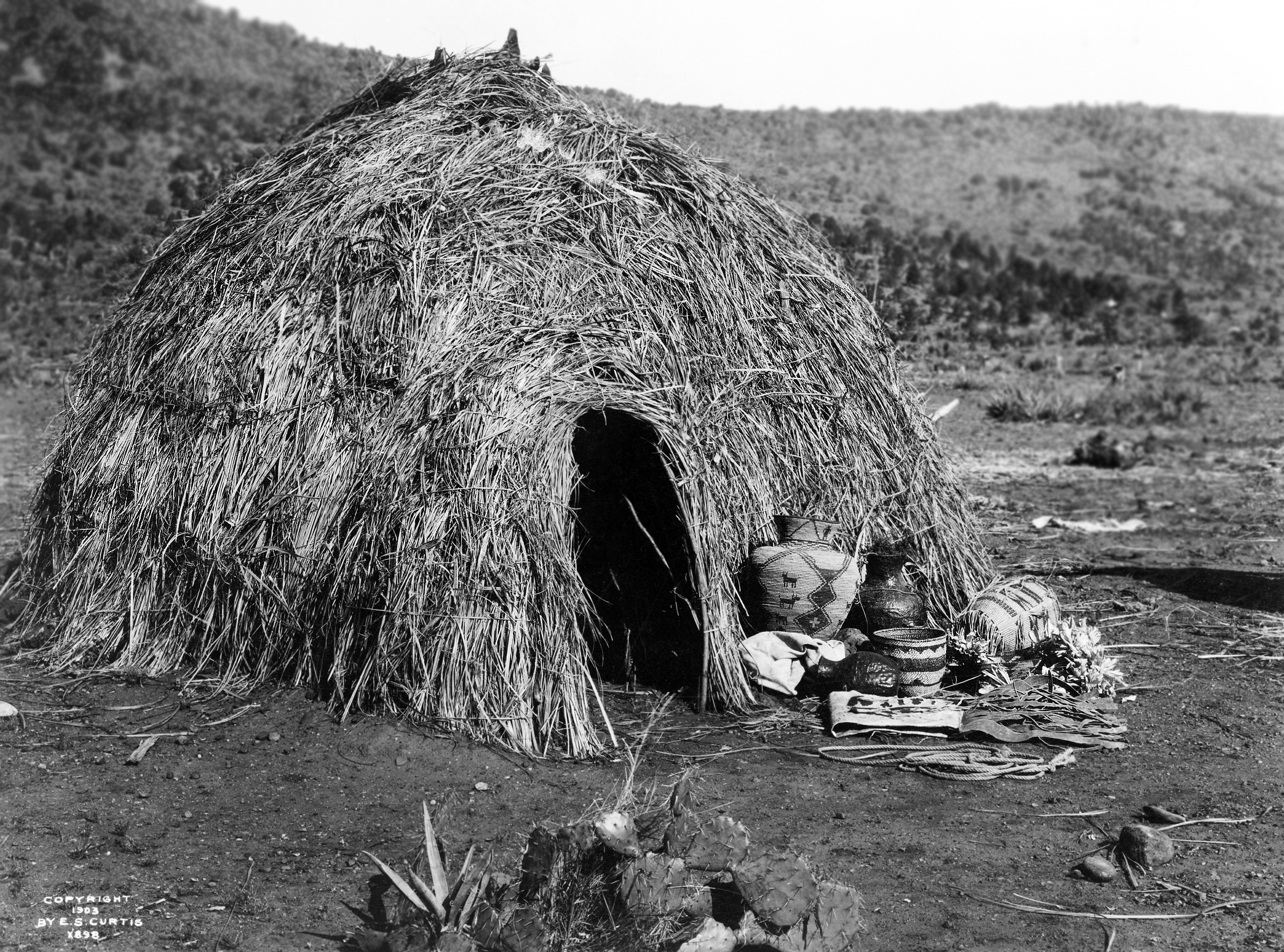
Apache wigwam (photographed by Edward S. Curtis, c. 1903)

Cultures from prehistory to modern times have constructed domed dwellings using local materials. Although it is not known when the first dome was created, sporadic examples of early domed structures have been discovered. The earliest discovered may be four small dwellings made of mammoth tusks and bones. The first was found by a farmer in Mezhirich, Ukraine, in 1965 while he was digging in his cellar, and archaeologists unearthed three more. They date from 19,280 – 11,700 BC.

In modern times, the creation of relatively simple dome-like structures has been documented among various indigenous peoples around the world. The wigwam was made by Native Americans using arched branches or poles covered with grass or hides. The Efé people of central Africa construct similar structures, using leaves as shingles. Another example is the igloo, a shelter built from blocks of compact snow and used by the Inuit, among others. The Himba people of Namibia construct "desert igloos" of wattle and daub for use as temporary shelters at seasonal cattle camps, and as permanent homes by the poor. Extraordinarily thin domes of sun-baked clay 6.1 metres (20 ft) in diameter, 9.1 metres (30 ft) high, and nearly parabolic in curve, are known from Cameroon.

The historical development from structures like these to more sophisticated domes is not well documented. That the dome was known to early Mesopotamia may explain the existence of domes in both China and the West in the first millennium BC. Another explanation, however, is that the use of the dome shape in construction did not have a single point of origin and was common in virtually all cultures long before domes were constructed with enduring materials.

Corbelled stone domes have been found from the Neolithic period in the ancient Near East, and in the Middle East to Western Europe from antiquity. The kings of Achaemenid Persia held audiences and festivals in domical tents derived from the nomadic traditions of central Asia. Simple domical mausoleums existed in the Hellenistic period. Indian bas-relief sculptures from Sāñcī (1st century BC), Bhārhut (2nd century BC), and Amarāvatī (2nd century BC), show domed huts, shrines, and pavilions. The remains of a large domed circular hall in the Parthian capital city of Nyssa has been dated to perhaps the first century AD, showing "...the existence of a monumental domical tradition in Central Asia that had hitherto been unknown and which seems to have preceded Roman Imperial monuments or at least to have grown independently from them." It is likely to have had a wooden dome.

=== East Asian domes ===
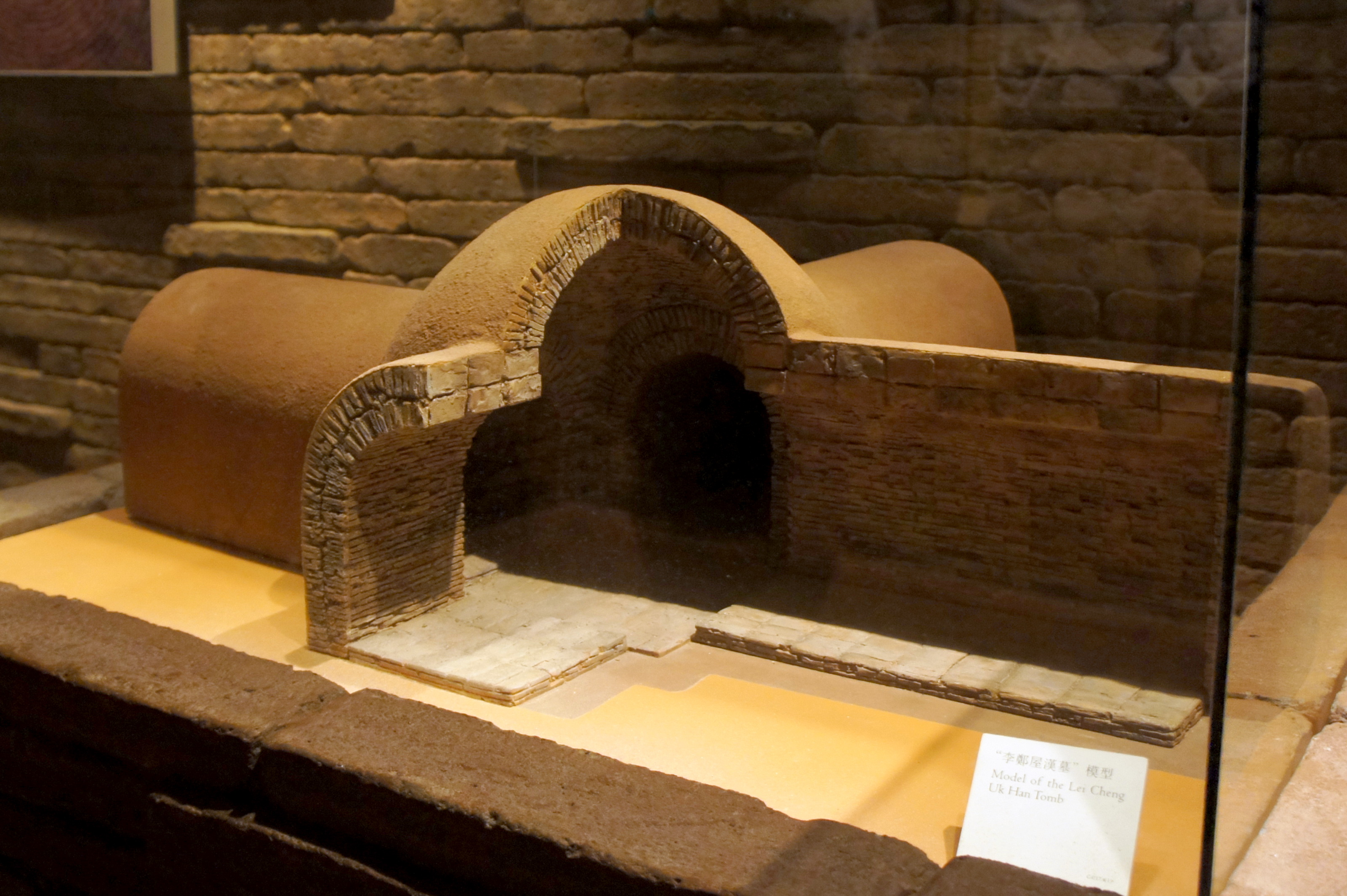
Model of the Lei Cheng Uk Han Tomb (25–220 AD)

Very little has survived of ancient Chinese architecture, due to the extensive use of timber as a building material. Brick and stone vaults used in tomb construction have survived, and the corbeled dome was used, rarely, in tombs and temples. The earliest true domes found in Chinese tombs were shallow cloister vaults, called simian jieding, derived from the Han use of barrel vaulting. Unlike the cloister vaults of western Europe, the corners are rounded off as they rise. The first known example is a brick tomb dating from the end of the Western Han period, near the modern city of Xiangcheng in Henan Province. These four-sided domes used small interlocking bricks and enabled a square space near the entrance of a tomb large enough for several people that may have been used for funeral ceremonies. The interlocking brick technique was rapidly adopted and four-sided domes became widespread outside Henan by the end of the first century AD.

A model of a tomb found with a shallow true dome from the late Han dynasty (206 BC – 220 AD) can be seen at the Guangzhou Museum (Canton). Another, the Lei Cheng Uk Han Tomb, found in Hong Kong in 1955, has a design common among Eastern Han dynasty (25 AD – 220 AD) tombs in South China: a barrel vaulted entrance leading to a domed front hall with barrel vaulted chambers branching from it in a cross shape. It is the only such tomb that has been found in Hong Kong and is exhibited as part of the Hong Kong Museum of History.

During the Three Kingdoms period (220–280), the "cross-joint dome" (siyuxuanjinshi) was developed under the Wu and Western Jin dynasties south of the Yangtze River, with arcs building out from the corners of a square room until they met and joined at the center. These domes were stronger, had a steeped angle, and could cover larger areas than the relatively shallow cloister vaults. Over time, they were made taller and wider. There were also corbel vaults, called diese, although these are the weakest type. Some tombs of the Song dynasty (960–1279) have beehive domes.

The Seokguram Grotto (751), built in the Korean city of Gyeongju during the Unified Silla period, includes a domed chamber 7.2 meters wide covering a statue of the Buddha. The dome is made from blocks of granite, with the flat cap of the dome decorated with a lotus flower motif. The dome is unique in north-east Asia.

The Buddhist monastery Baoguo near Ningbo has three domes dated to 1013. The Daoist monastery Yongle Gong in Shanxi has domes in its Hall of the Three Purities, from the 13th century.

The Fenghuang Mosque in Hangzhou has three domes along its back wall dating to the Yuan dynasty. The central dome is 8 meters in diameter and covered by an octagonal roof. The north and south flanking domes are 6.8 meters and 7.2 meters wide, respectively, and covered by hexagonal roofs. The zones of transition under the domes use a tiered system similar to muqarnas or the corner bracketing found in Chinese temples.

=== Ancient Roman and Byzantine domes ===
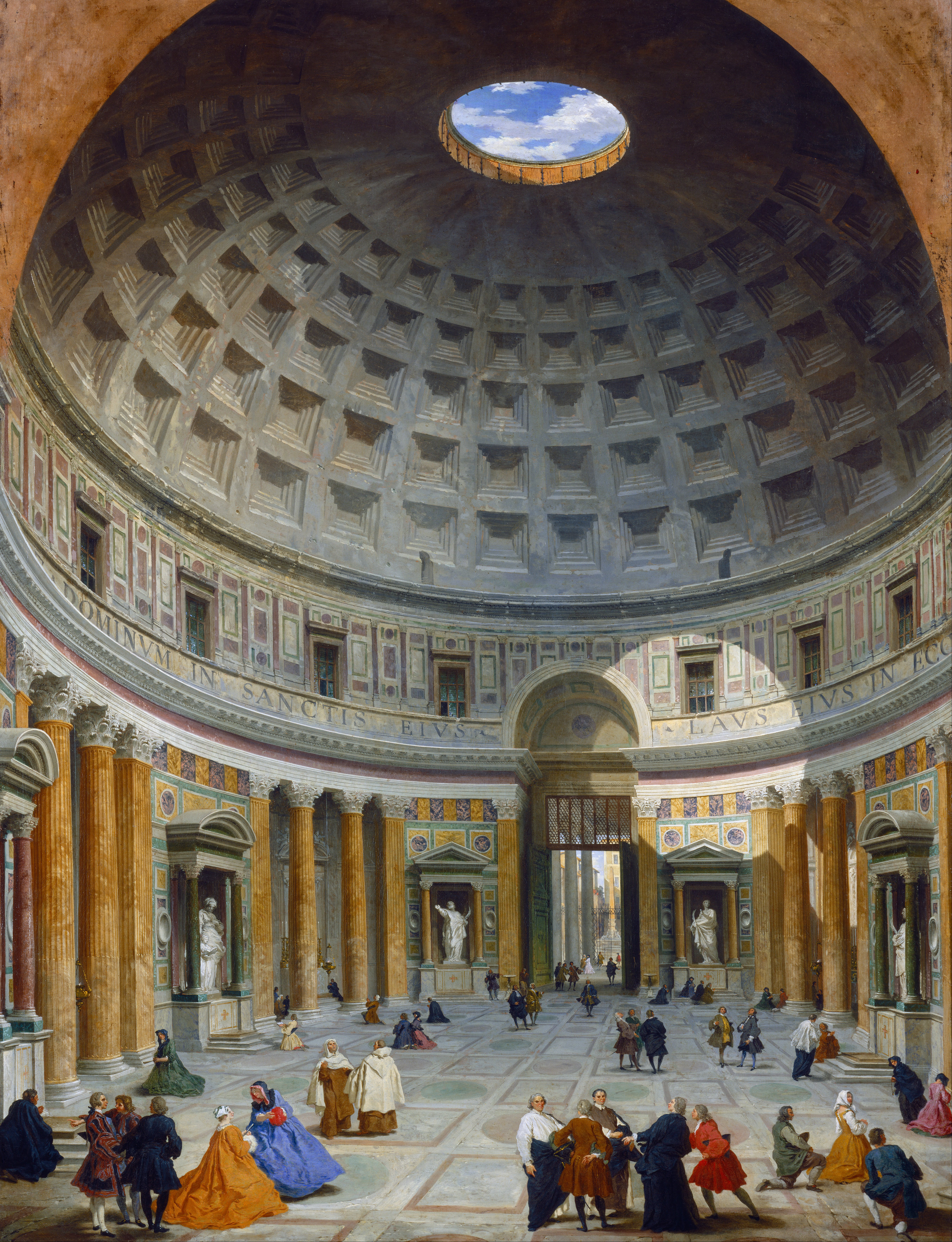
The Pantheon in Rome, in a painting by Giovanni Paolo Pannini

Roman domes are found in baths, villas, palaces, and tombs. oculi are common features. They are customarily hemispherical in shape and partially or totally concealed on the exterior. To buttress the horizontal thrusts of a large hemispherical masonry dome, the supporting walls were built up beyond the base to at least the haunches of the dome, and the dome was then also sometimes covered with a conical or polygonal roof.

Domes reached monumental size in the Roman Imperial period. Roman baths played a leading role in the development of domed construction in general, and monumental domes in particular. Modest domes in baths dating from the 2nd and 1st centuries BC are seen in Pompeii, in the cold rooms of the Terme Stabiane and the Terme del Foro. However, the extensive use of domes did not occur before the 1st century AD. The growth of domed construction increases under Emperor Nero and the Flavians in the 1st century AD, and during the 2nd century. Centrally planned halls become increasingly important parts of palace and palace villa layouts beginning in the 1st century, serving as state banqueting halls, audience rooms, or throne rooms. The Pantheon, a temple in Rome completed by the Emperor Hadrian as part of the Baths of Agrippa, is the most famous, best preserved, and largest Roman dome. Segmented domes, made of radially concave wedges or of alternating concave and flat wedges, appear under Hadrian in the 2nd century, and most preserved examples of this style date from this period.

In the 3rd century, Imperial mausoleums began to be built as domed rotundas, rather than as tumulus structures or other types, following similar monuments by private citizens. The technique of building lightweight domes with interlocking hollow ceramic tubes further developed in North Africa and Italy in the late 3rd and early 4th centuries. In the 4th century, Roman domes proliferated due to changes in the way domes were constructed, including advances in centering techniques and the use of brick ribbing. The material of choice in construction gradually transitioned during the 4th and 5th centuries from stone or concrete to lighter brick in thin shells. Baptisteries began to be built in the manner of domed mausoleums during the 4th century in Italy. The octagonal Lateran Baptistery or the baptistery of the Holy Sepulchre may have been the first, and the style spread during the 5th century. By the 5th century, structures with small-scale domed cross plans existed across the Christian world.

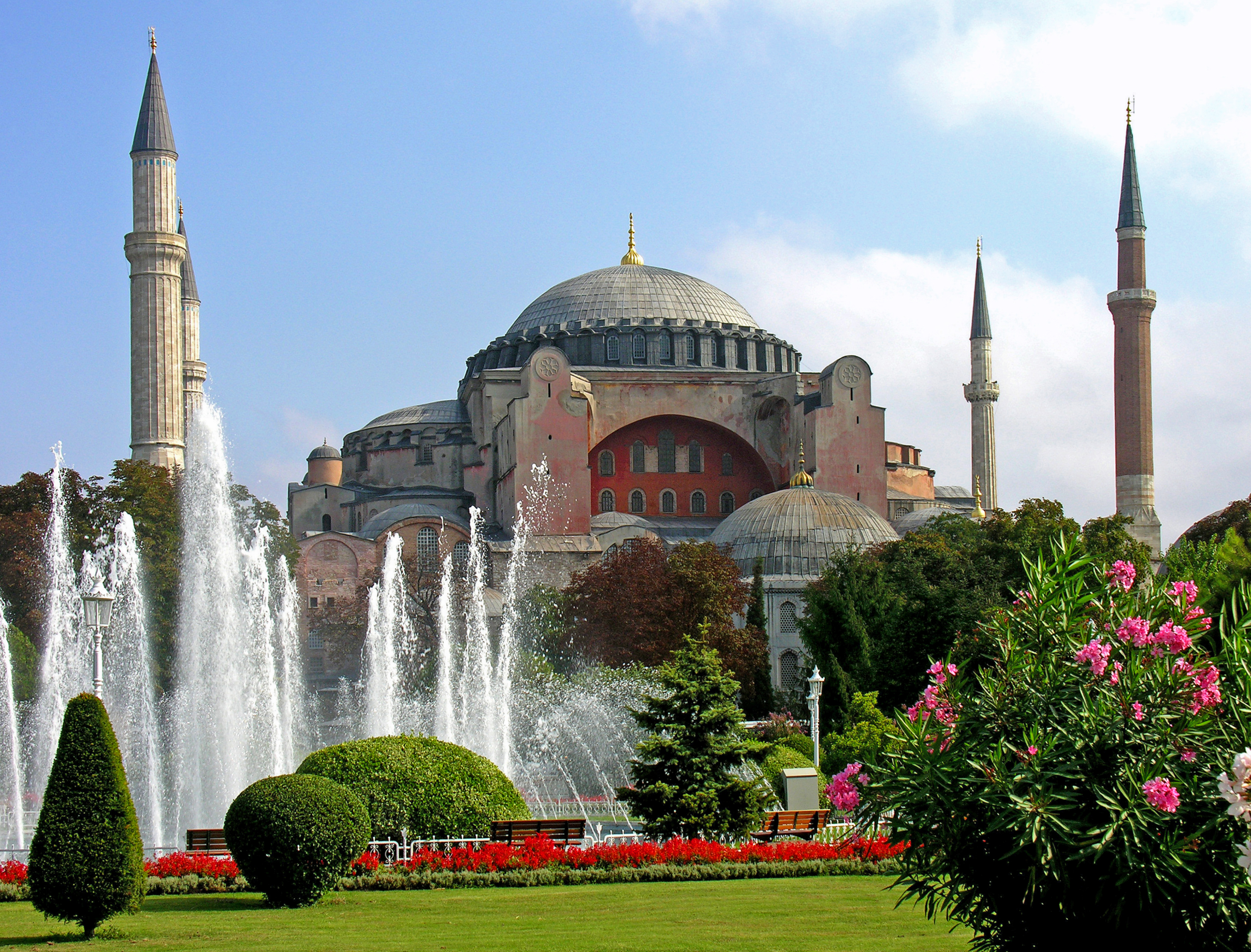
Hagia Sophia in Istanbul, Turkey.

With the end of the Western Roman Empire, domes became a signature feature of the church architecture of the surviving Eastern Roman — or "Byzantine" — Empire. 6th-century church building by the Emperor Justinian used the domed cross unit on a monumental scale, and his architects made the domed brick-vaulted central plan standard throughout the Roman east. This divergence with the Roman west from the second third of the 6th century may be considered the beginning of a "Byzantine" architecture. Justinian's Hagia Sophia was an original and innovative design with no known precedents in the way it covers a basilica plan with dome and semi-domes. Periodic earthquakes in the region have caused three partial collapses of the dome and necessitated repairs.

"Cross-domed units", a more secure structural system created by bracing a dome on all four sides with broad arches, became a standard element on a smaller scale in later Byzantine church architecture. The cross-in-square plan, with a single dome at the crossing or five domes in a quincunx pattern, became widely popular in the Middle Byzantine period (c. 843–1204). It is the most common church plan from the 10th century until the fall of Constantinople in 1453. Resting domes on circular or polygonal drums pierced with windows eventually became the standard style, with regional characteristics.

In the Byzantine period, domes were normally hemispherical and had, with occasional exceptions, windowed drums. All of the surviving examples in Constantinople are ribbed or pumpkin domes, with the divisions corresponding to the number of windows. Roofing for domes ranged from simple ceramic tile to more expensive, more durable, and more form-fitting lead sheeting. Metal clamps between stone cornice blocks, metal tie rods, and metal chains were also used to stabilize domed construction. The technique of using double shells for domes, although revived in the Renaissance, originated in Byzantine practice.

=== Persian domes ===
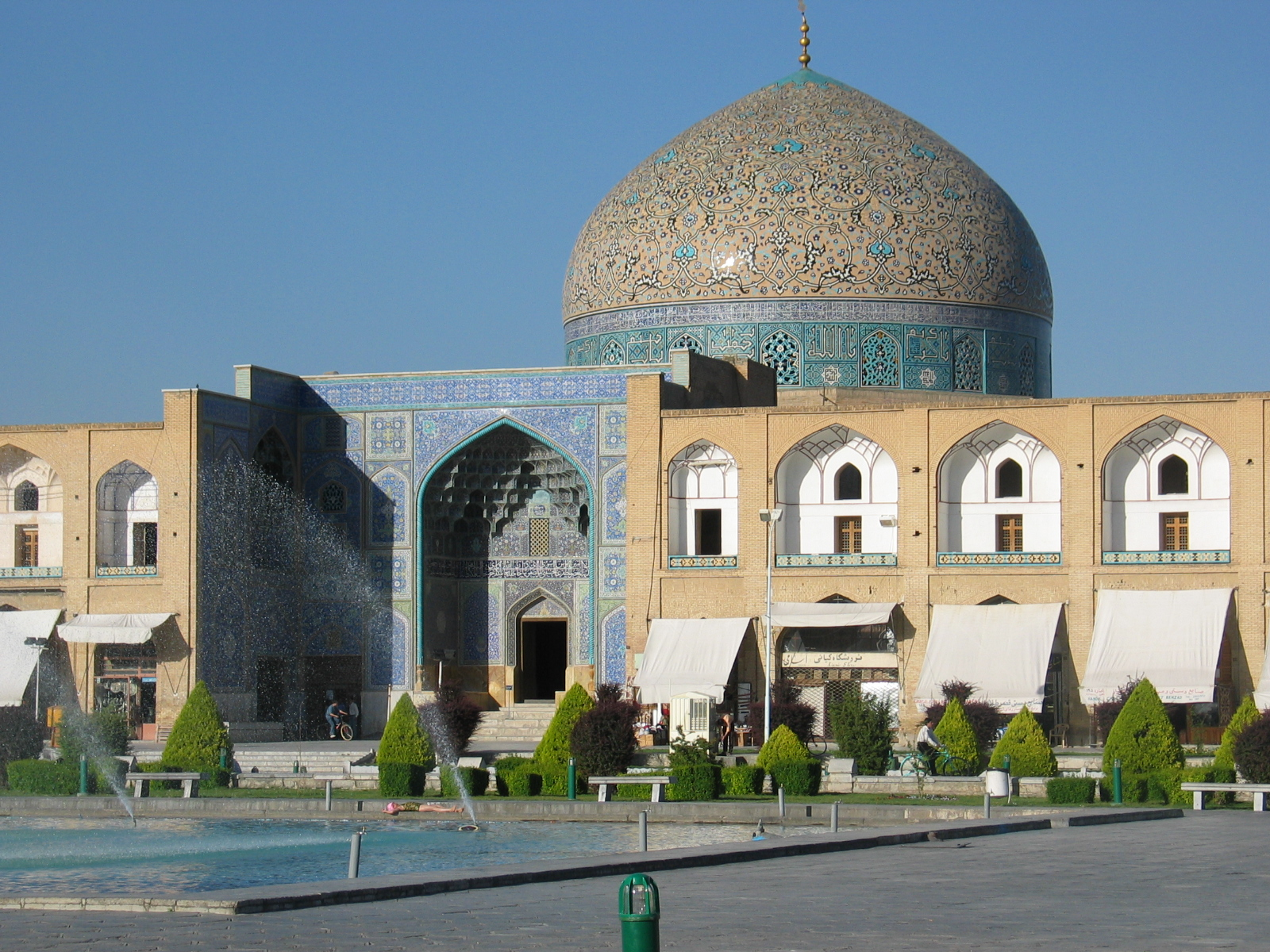
Sheikh Lotfollah Mosque, Isfahan, Iran

Persian architecture inherited an architectural tradition of dome-building which is likely to date back to the earliest Mesopotamian domes. Due to the scarcity of wood in many areas of the Iranian plateau and Greater Iran, domes were an important part of vernacular architecture throughout Persian history. The Persian invention of the squinch, a series of concentric arches forming a half-cone over the corner of a room, enabled the transition from the walls of a square chamber to an octagonal base for a dome in a way reliable enough for large constructions and domes moved to the forefront of Persian architecture as a result. Pre-Islamic domes in Persia are commonly semi-elliptical, with pointed domes and those with conical outer shells being the majority of the domes in the Islamic periods.

The area of north-eastern Iran was, along with Egypt, one of two areas notable for early developments in Islamic domed mausoleums, which appear in the tenth century. The Samanid Mausoleum in Transoxiana dates to no later than 943 and is the first to have squinches create a regular octagon as a base for the dome, which then became the standard practice. Cylindrical or polygonal plan tower tombs with conical roofs over domes also exist beginning in the 11th century.

The Seljuk Empire's notables built tomb-towers, called "Turkish Triangles", as well as cube mausoleums covered with a variety of dome forms. Seljuk domes included conical, semi-circular, and pointed shapes in one or two shells. Shallow semi-circular domes are mainly found from the Seljuk era. The double-shell domes were either discontinuous or continuous. The domed enclosure of the Jameh Mosque of Isfahan, built in 1086–7 by Nizam al-Mulk, was the largest masonry dome in the Islamic world at that time, had eight ribs, and introduced a new form of corner squinch with two quarter domes supporting a short barrel vault. In 1088 Tāj-al-Molk, a rival of Nizam al-Mulk, built another dome at the opposite end of the same mosque with interlacing ribs forming five-pointed stars and pentagons. This is considered the landmark Seljuk dome, and may have inspired subsequent patterning and the domes of the Il-Khanate period. The use of tile and of plain or painted plaster to decorate dome interiors, rather than brick, increased under the Seljuks.

Beginning in the Ilkhanate, Persian domes achieved their final configuration of structural supports, zone of transition, drum, and shells, and subsequent evolution was restricted to variations in form and shell geometry. Characteristic of these domes are the use of high drums and several types of discontinuous double-shells, and the development of triple-shells and internal stiffeners occurred at this time. The construction of tomb towers decreased. The 7.5 meter–wide double dome of Soltan Bakht Agha Mausoleum (1351–1352) is the earliest known example in which the two shells of the dome have significantly different profiles, which spread rapidly throughout the region. The development of taller drums also continued into the Timurid period. The large, bulbous, fluted domes on tall drums that are characteristic of 15th-century Timurid architecture were the culmination of the Central Asian and Iranian tradition of tall domes with glazed tile coverings in blue and other colors.

The domes of the Safavid dynasty (1501–1732) are characterized by a distinctive bulbous profile and are considered the last generation of Persian domes. They are generally thinner than earlier domes and are decorated with a variety of colored glazed tiles and complex vegetal patterns, and they were influential on those of other Islamic styles, such as the Mughal architecture of India. An exaggerated style of onion dome on a short drum, as can be seen at the Shah Cheragh (1852–1853), first appeared in the Qajar period. Domes have remained important in modern mausoleums, and domed cisterns and icehouses remain common sights in the countryside.

=== Arabic and Western European domes in the Middle Ages ===
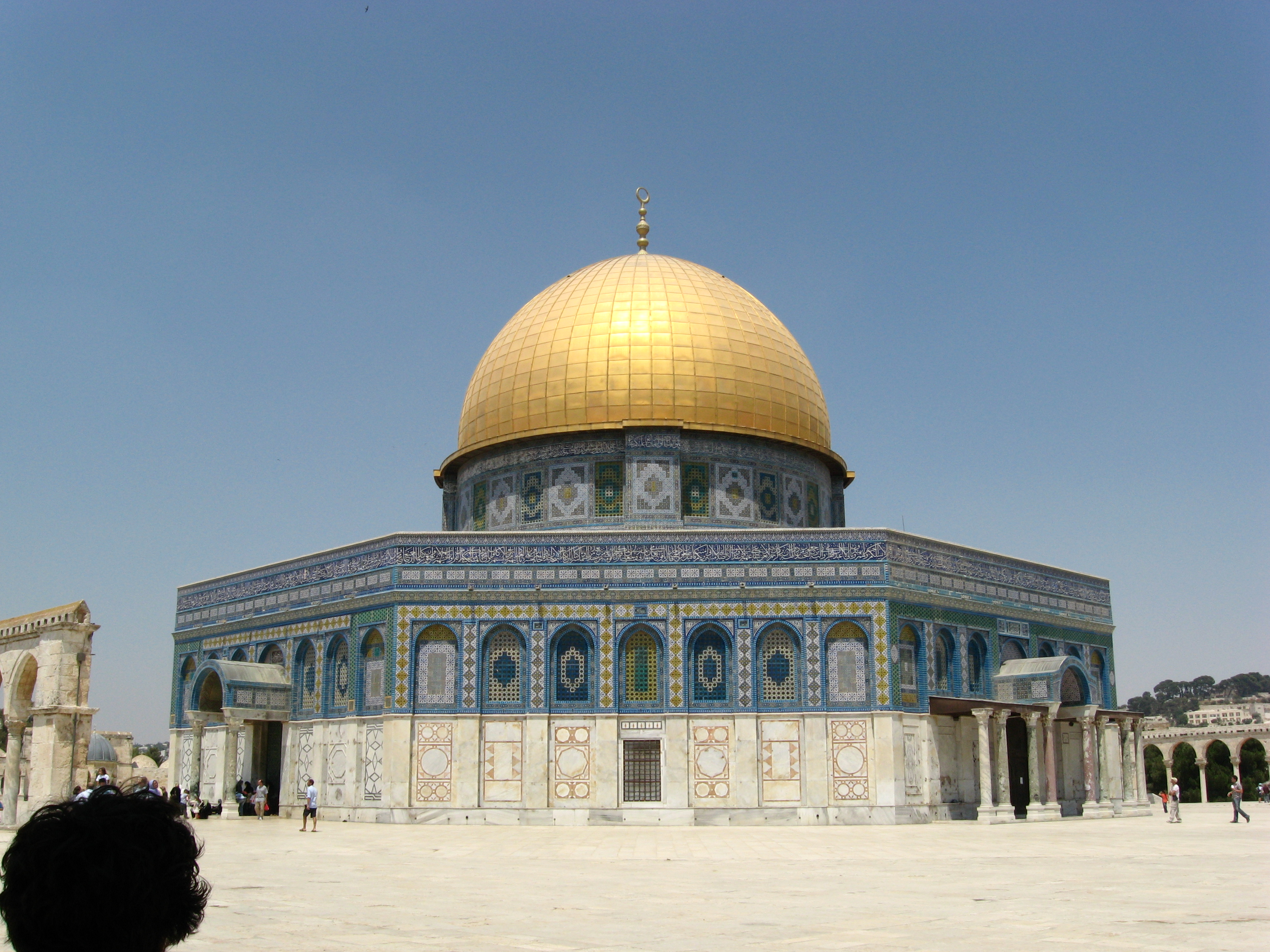
The Dome of the Rock in Jerusalem

The area of Syria and Palestine has a long tradition of domical architecture, including wooden domes in shapes described as "conoid", or similar to pine cones. When the Arab Muslim forces conquered the region, they employed local craftsmen for their buildings and, by the end of the 7th century, the dome had begun to become an architectural symbol of Islam. In addition to religious shrines, such as the Dome of the Rock, domes were used over the audience and throne halls of Umayyad palaces, and as part of porches, pavilions, fountains, towers and the calderia of baths. Blending the architectural features of both Byzantine and Persian architecture, the domes used both pendentives and squinches and were made in a variety of shapes and materials. Although architecture in the region would decline following the movement of the capital to Iraq under the Abbasids in 750, mosques built after a revival in the late 11th century usually followed the Umayyad model. Early versions of bulbous domes can be seen in mosaic illustrations in Syria dating to the Umayyad period. They were used to cover large buildings in Syria after the eleventh century.

Italian church architecture from the late sixth century to the end of the eighth century was influenced less by the trends of Constantinople than by a variety of Byzantine provincial plans. With the crowning of Charlemagne as a new Roman Emperor, Byzantine influences were largely replaced in a revival of earlier Western building traditions. Occasional exceptions include examples of early quincunx churches at Milan and near Cassino. Another is the Palatine Chapel. Its domed octagon design was influenced by Byzantine models. It was the largest dome north of the Alps at that time. Venice, Southern Italy and Sicily served as outposts of Middle Byzantine architectural influence in Italy.

The Great Mosque of Córdoba contains the first known examples of the crossed-arch dome type. The use of corner squinches to support domes was widespread in Islamic architecture by the 10th and 11th centuries. After the ninth century, mosques in North Africa often have a small decorative dome over the mihrab. Additional domes are sometimes used at the corners of the mihrab wall, at the entrance bay, or on the square tower minarets. Egypt, along with north-eastern Iran, was one of two areas notable for early developments in Islamic mausoleums, beginning in the 10th century. Fatimid mausoleums were mostly simple square buildings covered by a dome. Domes were smooth or ribbed and had a characteristic Fatimid "keel" shape profile.

Domes in Romanesque architecture are generally found within crossing towers at the intersection of a church's nave and transept, which conceal the domes externally. They are typically octagonal in plan and use corner squinches to translate a square bay into a suitable octagonal base. They appear "in connection with basilicas almost throughout Europe" between 1050 and 1100. The Crusades, beginning in 1095, also appear to have influenced domed architecture in Western Europe, particularly in the areas around the Mediterranean Sea. The Knights Templar, headquartered at the site, built a series of centrally planned churches throughout Europe modeled on the Church of the Holy Sepulchre, with the Dome of the Rock also an influence. In southwest France, there are over 250 domed Romanesque churches in the Périgord region alone. The use of pendentives to support domes in the Aquitaine region, rather than the squinches more typical of western medieval architecture, strongly implies a Byzantine influence. Gothic domes are uncommon due to the use of rib vaults over naves, and with church crossings usually focused instead by a tall steeple, but there are examples of small octagonal crossing domes in cathedrals as the style developed from the Romanesque.

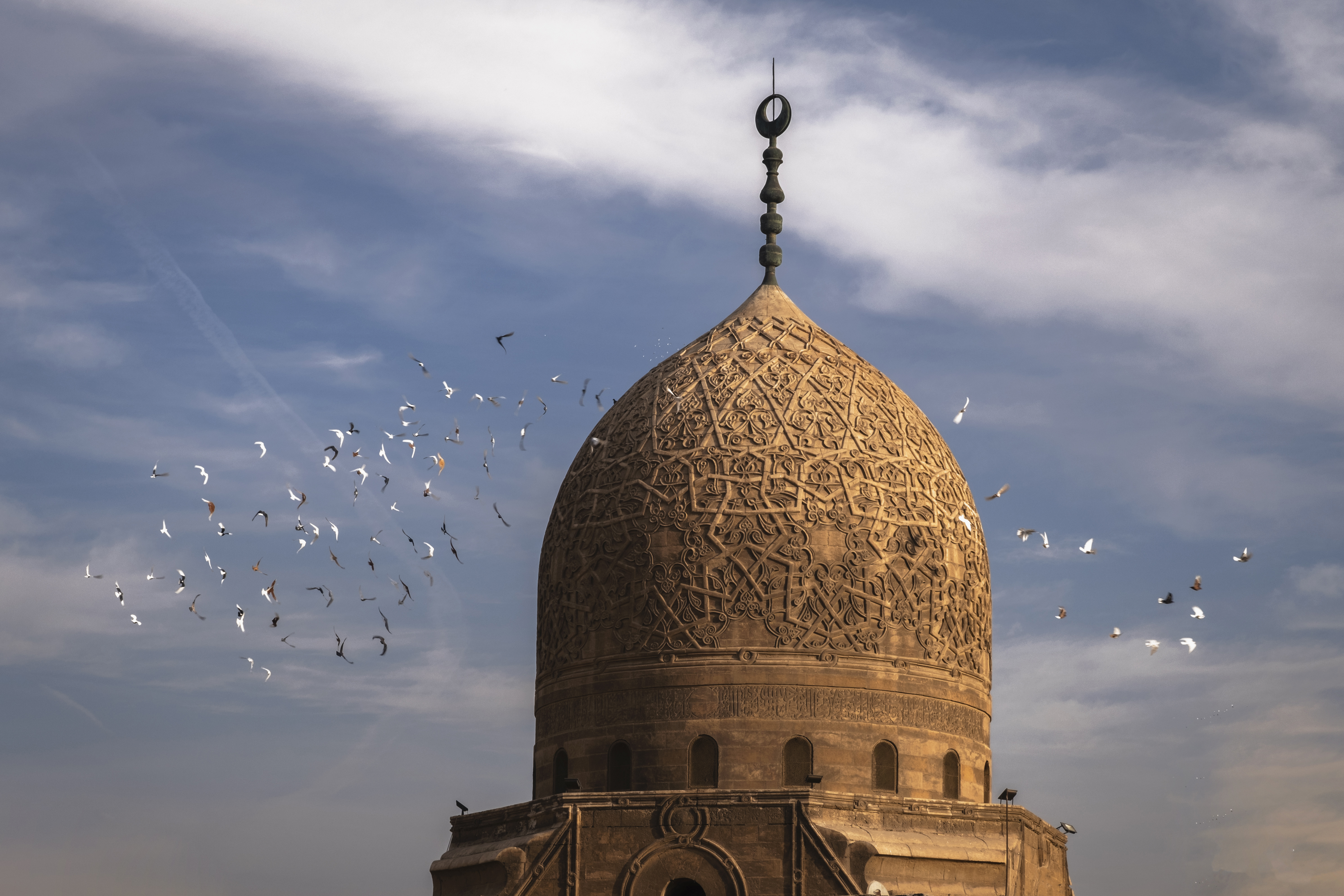
Dome of the complex of Sultan Qaytbay

Star-shaped domes found at the Moorish palace of the Alhambra in Granada, Spain; the Hall of the Abencerrajes (c. 1333–1391) and the Hall of the two Sisters (c. 1333–1354) are extraordinarily developed examples of muqarnas domes. In the first half of the fourteenth century, stone blocks replaced bricks as the primary building material in the dome construction of Mamluk Egypt and, over the course of 250 years, around 400 domes were built in Cairo to cover the tombs of Mamluk sultans and emirs. Dome profiles were varied, with "keel-shaped", bulbous, ogee, stilted domes, and others being used. On the drum, angles were chamfered, or sometimes stepped, externally and triple windows were used in a tri-lobed arrangement on the faces. Bulbous cupolas on minarets were used in Egypt beginning around 1330, spreading to Syria in the following century. In the fifteenth century, pilgrimages to and flourishing trade relations with the Near East exposed the Low Countries of northwest Europe to the use of bulbous domes in the architecture of the Orient, and such domes apparently became associated with the city of Jerusalem. Multi-story spires with truncated bulbous cupolas supporting smaller cupolas or crowns became popular in the sixteenth century.

=== Russian domes ===
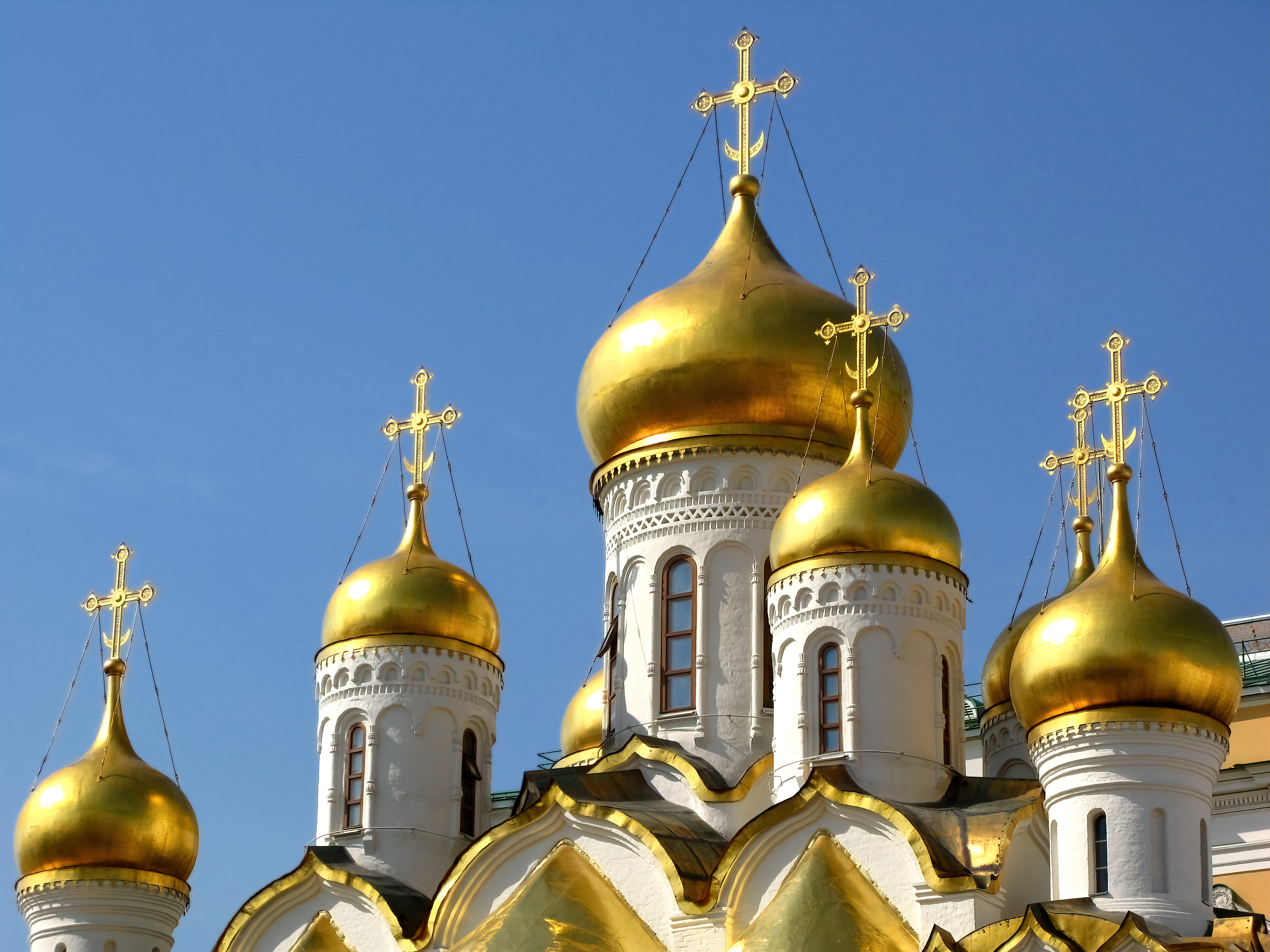
Gilded onion domes of the Cathedral of the Annunciation, Moscow Kremlin.

The multidomed church is a typical form of Russian church architecture that distinguishes Russia from other Orthodox nations and Christian denominations. Indeed, the earliest Russian churches, built just after the Christianization of Kievan Rus', were multi-domed, which has led some historians to speculate about how Russian pre-Christian pagan temples might have looked. Examples of these early churches are the 13-domed wooden Saint Sophia Cathedral in Novgorod (989) and the 25-domed stone Desyatinnaya Church in Kiev (989–996). The number of domes typically has a symbolical meaning in Russian architecture, for example 13 domes symbolize Christ with 12 Apostles, while 25 domes means the same with an additional 12 Prophets of the Old Testament. The multiple domes of Russian churches were often comparatively smaller than Byzantine domes.

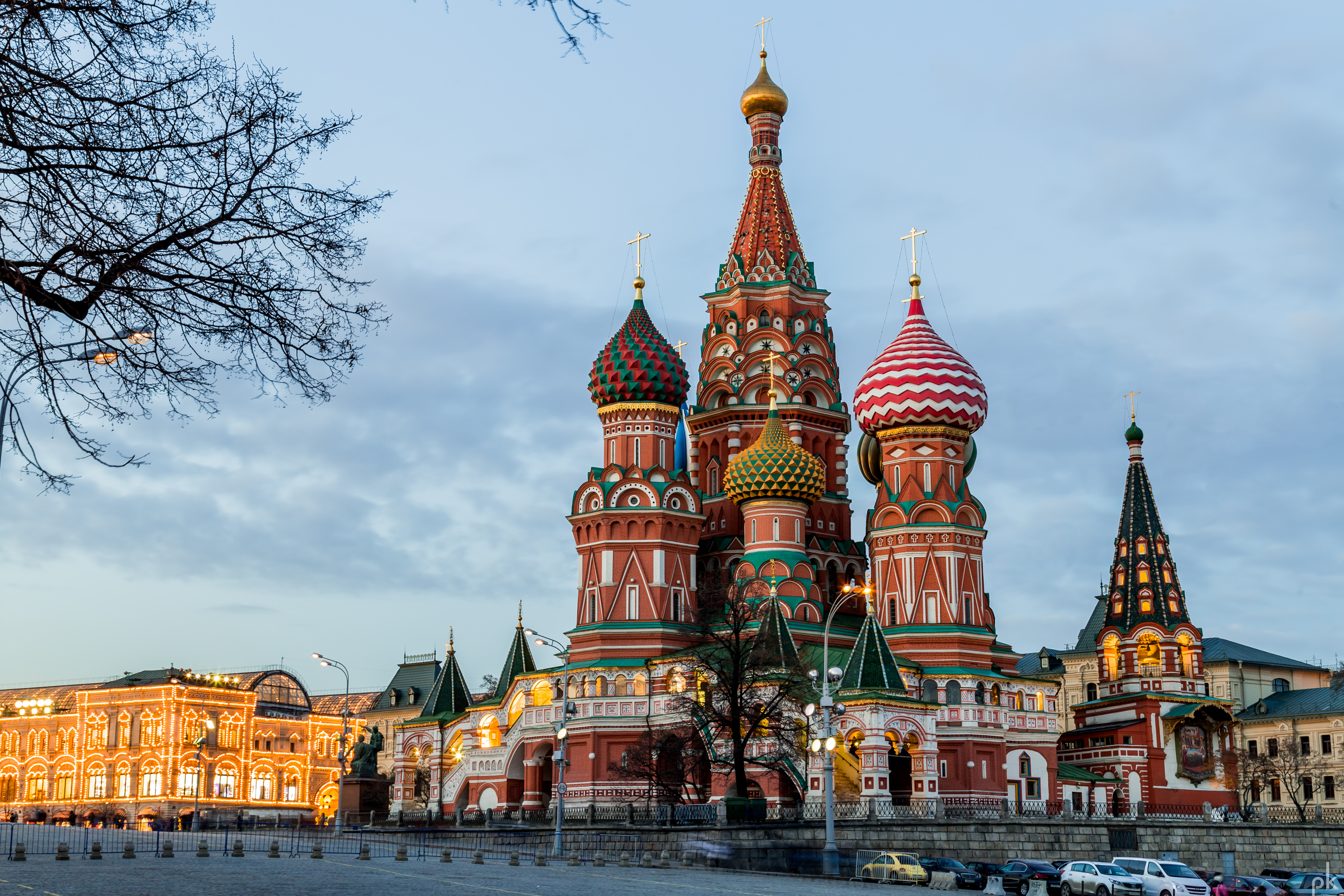
Saint Basil's Cathedral (1555–61) in Moscow, Russia. Its distinctive onion domes date to the 1680s.

Plentiful timber in Russia made wooden domes common and at least partially contributed to the popularity of onion domes, which were easier to shape in wood than in masonry. The earliest stone churches in Russia featured Byzantine style domes, however by the Early Modern era the onion dome had become the predominant form in traditional Russian architecture. The onion dome is a dome whose shape resembles an onion, after which they are named. Such domes are often larger in diameter than the drums they sit on, and their height usually exceeds their width. The whole bulbous structure tapers smoothly to a point. Though the earliest preserved Russian domes of such type date from the 16th century, illustrations from older chronicles indicate they have existed since the late 13th century. Like tented roofs—which were combined with, and sometimes replaced domes in Russian architecture since the 16th century—onion domes initially were used only in wooden churches. Builders introduced them into stone architecture much later, and continued to make their carcasses of either of wood or metal on top of masonry drums.

Russian domes are often gilded or brightly painted. A dangerous technique of chemical gilding using mercury had been applied on some occasions until the mid-19th century, most notably in the giant dome of Saint Isaac's Cathedral. The more modern and safe method of gold electroplating was applied for the first time in gilding the domes of the Cathedral of Christ the Saviour in Moscow, the tallest Eastern Orthodox church in the world.

=== Ukrainian domes ===
The domes of the Saint Sophia Cathedral and Dormition Cathedral were remodeled to the helmet-shaped baroque style by Ivan Mazepa in the early 18th century, who also paid for gilding of the domes. Mazepa's reign also included the construction of an octagonal western bay with a baroque dome (1672) and five helmet-shaped domes over Boris and Gleb Cathedral in Chernihiv, which were removed in the 20th century by the Soviet government.

=== Ottoman domes ===
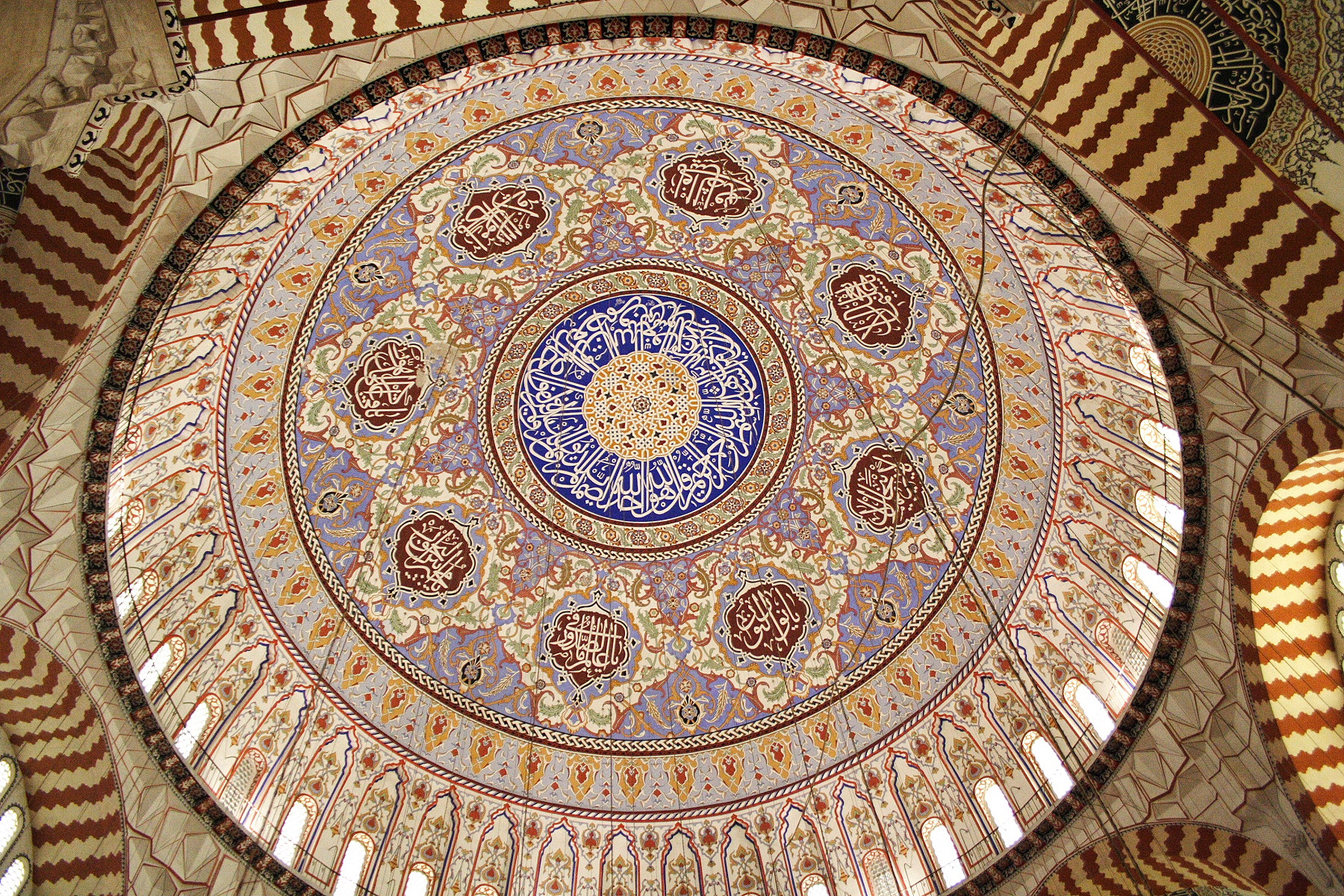
Dome of the Selimiye Mosque in Edirne, Turkey

The rise of the Ottoman Empire and its spread in Asia Minor and the Balkans coincided with the decline of the Seljuk Turks and the Byzantine Empire. Early Ottoman buildings, for almost two centuries after 1300, were characterized by a blending of Ottoman culture and indigenous architecture, and the pendentive dome was used throughout the empire. The Byzantine dome form was adopted and further developed. Ottoman architecture made exclusive use of the semi-spherical dome for vaulting over even very small spaces, influenced by the earlier traditions of both Byzantine Anatolia and Central Asia. The smaller the structure, the simpler the plan, but mosques of medium size were also covered by single domes.

Early experiments with large domes include the domed square mosques of Çine and Mudurnu under Bayezid I and the later domed "zawiya-mosques" at Bursa. The Üç Şerefeli Mosque at Edirne developed the idea of the central dome being a larger version of the domed modules used throughout the rest of the structure to generate open space. This idea became important to the Ottoman style as it developed.

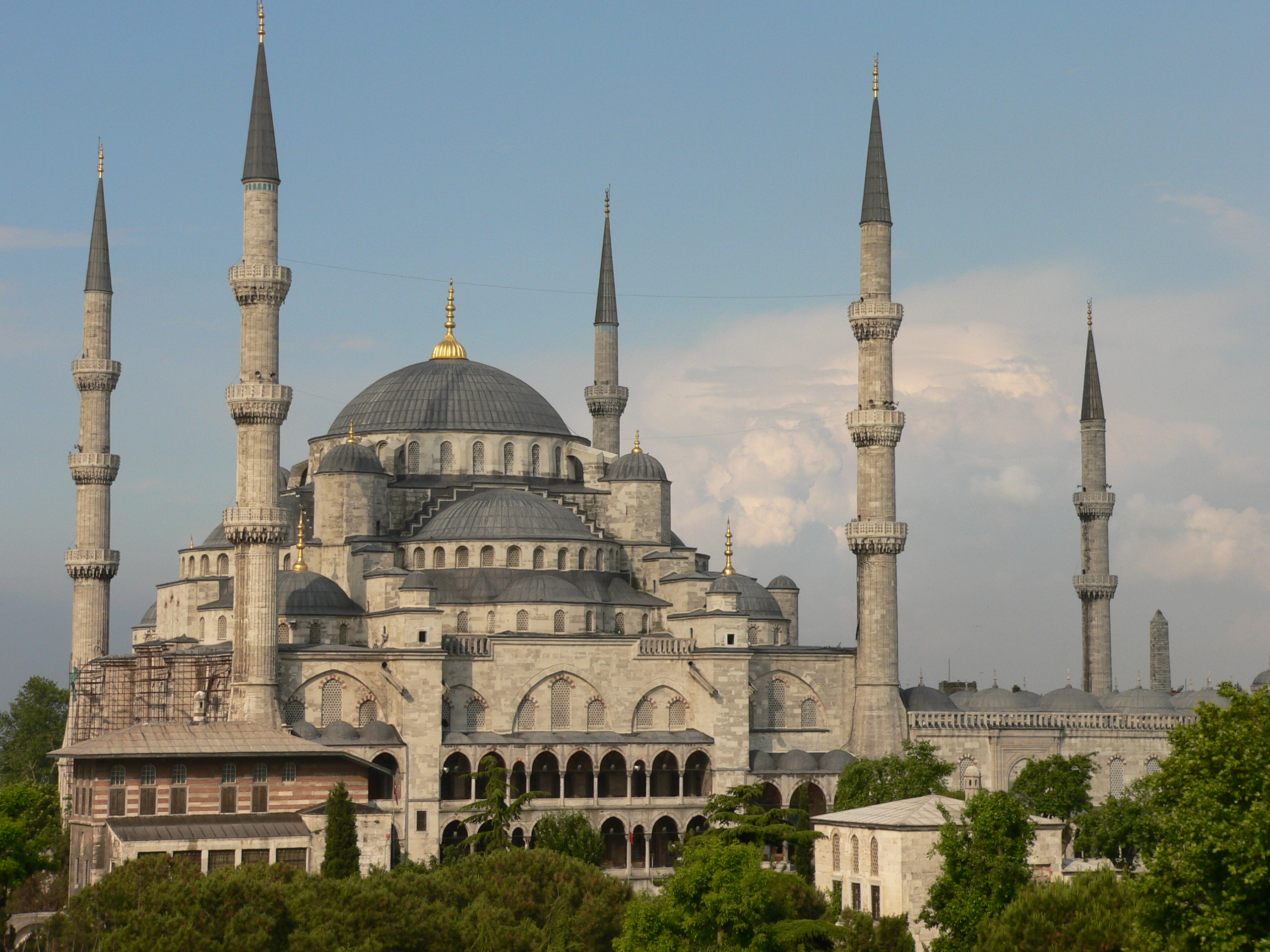
The Blue Mosque in Istanbul, an example of the classical period of Ottoman architecture, showing Byzantine influence

The Bayezid II Mosque (1501–1506) in Istanbul begins the classical period in Ottoman architecture, in which the great imperial mosques, with variations, resemble the former Byzantine basilica of Hagia Sophia in having a large central dome with semi-domes of the same span to the east and west. Hagia Sophia's central dome arrangement is largely reproduced in three Ottoman mosques in Istanbul: the Bayezid II Mosque, the Kılıç Ali Pasha Mosque, and the Süleymaniye Mosque. Other Imperial mosques in Istanbul added semi-domes to the north and south, doing away with the basilica plan, starting with the Şehzade Mosque and seen again in later examples such as the Sultan Ahmed I Mosque and the Yeni Cami. The classical period lasted into the 17th century but its peak is associated with the architect Mimar Sinan in the 16th century. In addition to large imperial mosques, he designed hundreds of other monuments, including medium-sized mosques such as the Mihrimah Sultan Mosque, Sokollu Mehmed Pasha Mosque, and Rüstem Pasha Mosque and the tomb of Suleiman the Magnificent, with its double-shell dome. The Süleymaniye Mosque, built from 1550 to 1557, has a main dome 53 meters high with a diameter of 26.5 meters. At the time it was built, the dome was the highest in the Ottoman Empire when measured from sea level, but lower from the floor of the building and smaller in diameter than that of the nearby Hagia Sophia.

Another classical domed mosque type is, like the Byzantine church of Sergius and Bacchus, the domed polygon within a square. Octagons and hexagons were common, such as those of the Üç Şerefeli Mosque (1437–1447) and the Selimiye Mosque in Edirne. The Selimiye Mosque was the first structure built by the Ottomans that had a larger dome than that of the Hagia Sophia. The dome rises above a square bay. Corner semi-domes convert this into an octagon, which muqarnas transition to a circular base. The dome has an average internal diameter of about 31.5 meters, while that of Hagia Sophia averages 31.3 meters. It was designed and built by the architect Mimar Sinan between 1568 and 1574; when he finished it he was 86 years old, and he considered the mosque to be his masterpiece.

The Maqam an-Nabi Yusha', near the Golan Heights, is purported to be the tomb of the Joshua and includes two domed chambers. The principal room is the west domed chamber, which has a hemispherical dome on a short circular drum and spherical pendentives. The west domed chamber was built earlier than the east domed chamber and appears to be from the 18th century.

=== Italian Renaissance domes ===
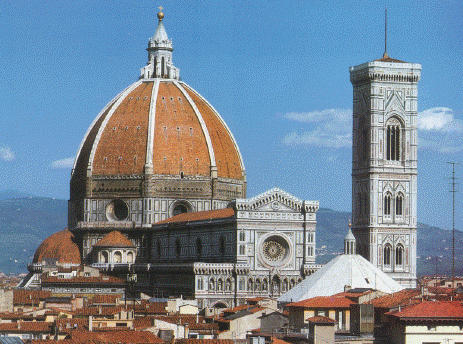
The Cathedral of Florence with Brunelleschi's dome, Italy

Filippo Brunelleschi's octagonal brick domical vault over Florence Cathedral was built between 1420 and 1436, and the lantern surmounting the dome was completed in 1467. The dome is 42 meters wide and made of two shells. The dome is not itself Renaissance in style, although the lantern is closer. A combination of dome, drum, pendentives, and barrel vaults developed as the characteristic structural forms of large Renaissance churches following a period of innovation in the later fifteenth century. Florence was the first Italian city to develop the new style, followed by Rome and then Venice. Brunelleschi's domes at San Lorenzo and the Pazzi Chapel established them as a key element of Renaissance architecture. His plan for the dome of the Pazzi Chapel in the Florentine basilica of Santa Croce (1430–1452) illustrates the Renaissance enthusiasm for geometry and for the circle as geometry's supreme form. This emphasis on geometric essentials would be very influential.

De re aedificatoria, written by Leon Battista Alberti around 1452, recommends vaults with coffering for churches, as in the Pantheon, and the first design for a dome at St. Peter's Basilica in Rome is usually attributed to him, although the recorded architect is Bernardo Rossellino. This would culminate in Bramante's 1505–06 projects for a wholly new St. Peter's Basilica, marking the beginning of the displacement of the Gothic ribbed vault with the combination of dome and barrel vault, which proceeded throughout the sixteenth century. Bramante's initial design was for a Greek cross plan with a large central hemispherical dome and four smaller domes around it in a quincunx pattern. Work began in 1506 and continued under a succession of builders over the next 120 years. The dome was completed by Giacomo della Porta and Domenico Fontana. The publication of Sebastiano Serlio's treatise, one of the most popular architectural treatises ever published, was responsible for the spread of the oval in late Renaissance and Baroque architecture throughout Italy, Spain, France, and central Europe.

The Villa Capra, also known as "La Rotunda", was built by Andrea Palladio from 1565 to 1569 near Vicenza. Its highly symmetrical square plan centers on a circular room covered by a dome, and it proved highly influential on the Georgian architects of 18th-century England, architects in Russia, and architects in America, Thomas Jefferson among them. Palladio's two domed churches in Venice are San Giorgio Maggiore (1565–1610) and Il Redentore (1577–1592), the latter built in thanksgiving for the end of a bad outbreak of plague in the city. The spread of the Renaissance-style dome outside of Italy began with central Europe, although there was often a stylistic delay of a century or two.

=== South Asian domes ===
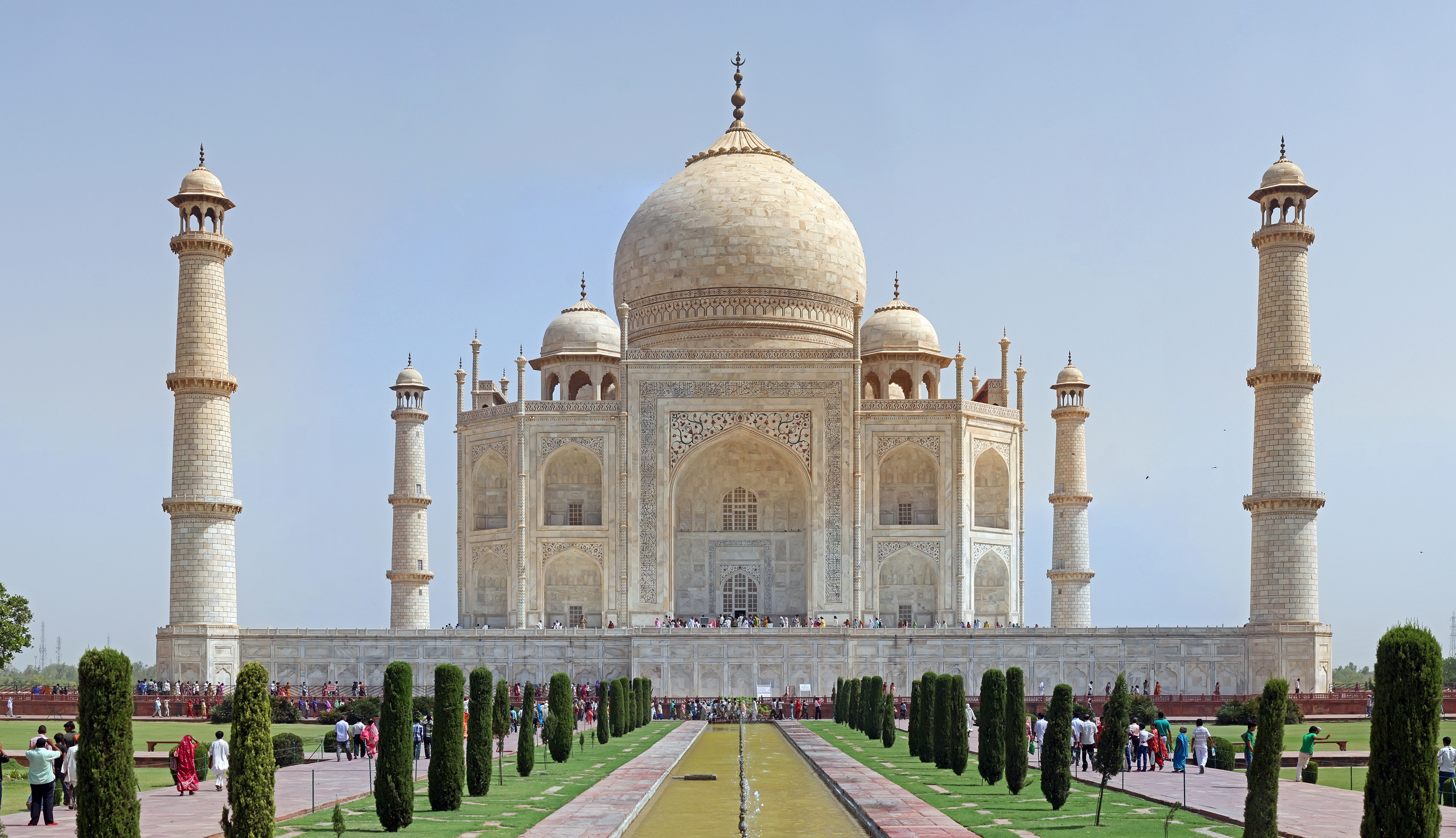
The Taj Mahal in Agra, India, built by Shah Jahan

Hemispherical rock-cut tombs appear to imitate in stone the early bamboo or timber-roofed domed huts with central poles known from the pre-Buddhist period. Examples include Sudama cave (3rd century BC) in Bihar, a similar domed chamber at Cannanora in Malabar, and a cave at Guntpalle (1st century BC). A rock-cut hemispherical chamber at Manappuram in Kerala retained a thin central pillar with no structural function. The hemispherical shape of Buddhist stupas, which are likely to be refined forms of burial mounds, may also reflect earlier wooden domed roof construction, such as at Ghantasala.

Islamic rule over northern and central India brought with it the use of domes constructed with stone, brick and mortar, and iron dowels and cramps. Centering was made from timber and bamboo. The use of iron cramps to join together adjacent stones was known in pre-Islamic India, and was used at the base of domes for hoop reinforcement. The synthesis of styles created by this introduction of new forms to the Hindu tradition of trabeate construction created a distinctive architecture. Domes in pre-Mughal India have a standard squat circular shape with a lotus design and bulbous finial at the top, derived from Hindu architecture. Because the Hindu architectural tradition did not include arches, flat corbels were used to transition from the corners of the room to the dome, rather than squinches. In contrast to Persian and Ottoman domes, the domes of Indian tombs tend to be more bulbous.

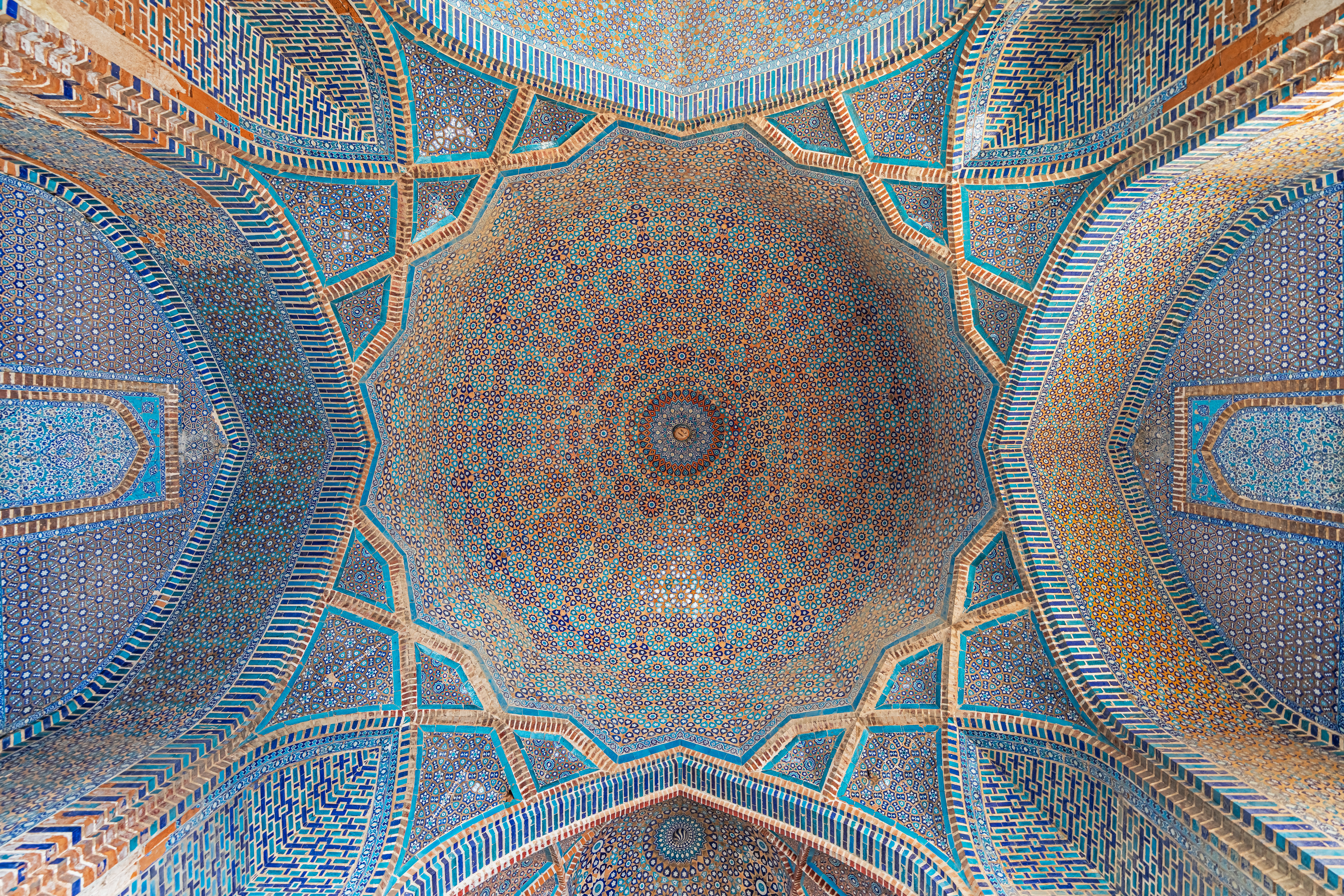
The Shah Jahan Mosque's main dome in Thatta, Pakistan, has tiles arranged in a stellate pattern to represent the night sky.

The earliest examples include the half-domes of the late 13th-century tomb of Balban and the small dome of the tomb of Khan Shahid, which were made of roughly cut material and would have needed covering surface finishes. Under the Lodi dynasty there was a large proliferation of tomb building, with octagonal plans reserved for royalty and square plans used for others of high rank, and the first double dome was introduced to India in this period. The first major Mughal building is the domed tomb of Humayun, built between 1562 and 1571 by a Persian architect. The central double dome covers an octagonal central chamber about 15 meters wide and is accompanied by small domed chattri made of brick and faced with stone. Chhatris, the domed kiosks on pillars characteristic of Mughal roofs, were adopted from their Hindu use as cenotaphs. The fusion of Persian and Indian architecture can be seen in the domed shape of the Taj Mahal: the bulbous shape derives from Persian Timurid domes, and the finial with lotus leaf base is derived from Hindu temples. The Gol Gumbaz, or Round Dome, is one of the largest masonry domes in the world. It has an internal diameter of 41.15 meters and a height of 54.25 meters. The dome was the most technically advanced built in the Deccan. The last major Islamic tomb built in India was the tomb of Safdar Jang (1753–54). The central dome is reportedly triple-shelled, with two relatively flat inner brick domes and an outer bulbous marble dome, although it may actually be that the marble and second brick domes are joined everywhere but under the lotus leaf finial at the top.

=== Early modern domes ===
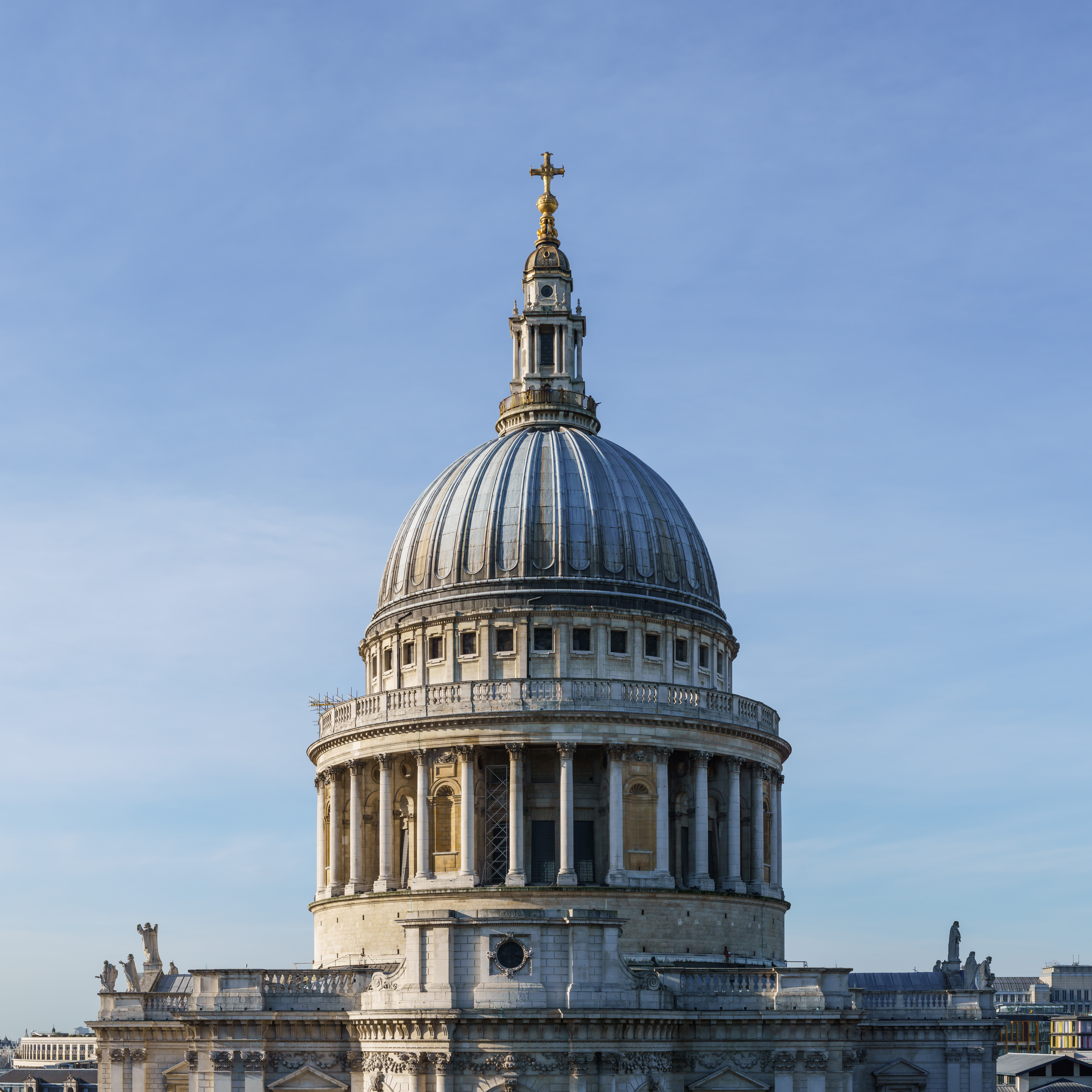
The dome of St. Paul's Cathedral in London

In the early sixteenth century, the lantern of the Italian dome spread to Germany, gradually adopting the bulbous cupola from the Netherlands. Russian architecture strongly influenced the many bulbous domes of the wooden churches of Bohemia and Silesia and, in Bavaria, bulbous domes less resemble Dutch models than Russian ones. Domes like these gained in popularity in central and southern Germany and in Austria in the seventeenth and eighteenth centuries, particularly in the Baroque style, and influenced many bulbous cupolas in Poland and Eastern Europe in the Baroque period. However, many bulbous domes in eastern Europe were replaced over time in the larger cities during the second half of the eighteenth century in favor of hemispherical or stilted cupolas in the French or Italian styles.

The construction of domes in the sixteenth and seventeenth centuries relied primarily on empirical techniques and oral traditions rather than the architectural treatises of the times, which avoided practical details. This was adequate for domes up to medium size, with diameters in the range of 12 to 20 meters. Materials were considered homogeneous and rigid, with compression taken into account and elasticity ignored. The weight of materials and the size of the dome were the key references. Lateral tensions in a dome were counteracted with horizontal rings of iron, stone, or wood incorporated into the structure.

Over the course of the seventeenth and eighteenth centuries, developments in mathematics and the study of statics led to a more precise formalization of the ideas of the traditional constructive practices of arches and vaults, and there was a diffusion of studies on the most stable form for these structures: the catenary curve. Robert Hooke, who first articulated that a catenary arch was comparable to an inverted hanging chain, may have advised Wren on how to achieve the crossing dome of St. Paul's Cathedral. Wren's structural system became the standard for large domes well into the 19th century. The ribs in Guarino Guarini's San Lorenzo and Il Sindone were shaped as catenary arches. The idea of a large oculus in a solid dome revealing a second dome originated with him. He also established the oval dome as a reconciliation of the longitudinal plan church favored by the liturgy of the Counter-Reformation and the centralized plan favored by idealists. Because of the imprecision of oval domes in the Rococo period, drums were problematic and the domes instead often rested directly on arches or pendentives.

In the eighteenth century, the study of dome structures changed radically, with domes being considered as a composition of smaller elements, each subject to mathematical and mechanical laws and easier to analyse individually, rather than being considered as whole units unto themselves. Although never very popular in domestic settings, domes were used in a number of 18th-century homes built in the Neoclassical style. In the United States, most public buildings in the late 18th century were only distinguishable from private residences because they featured cupolas.

=== 19th-century and later domes ===
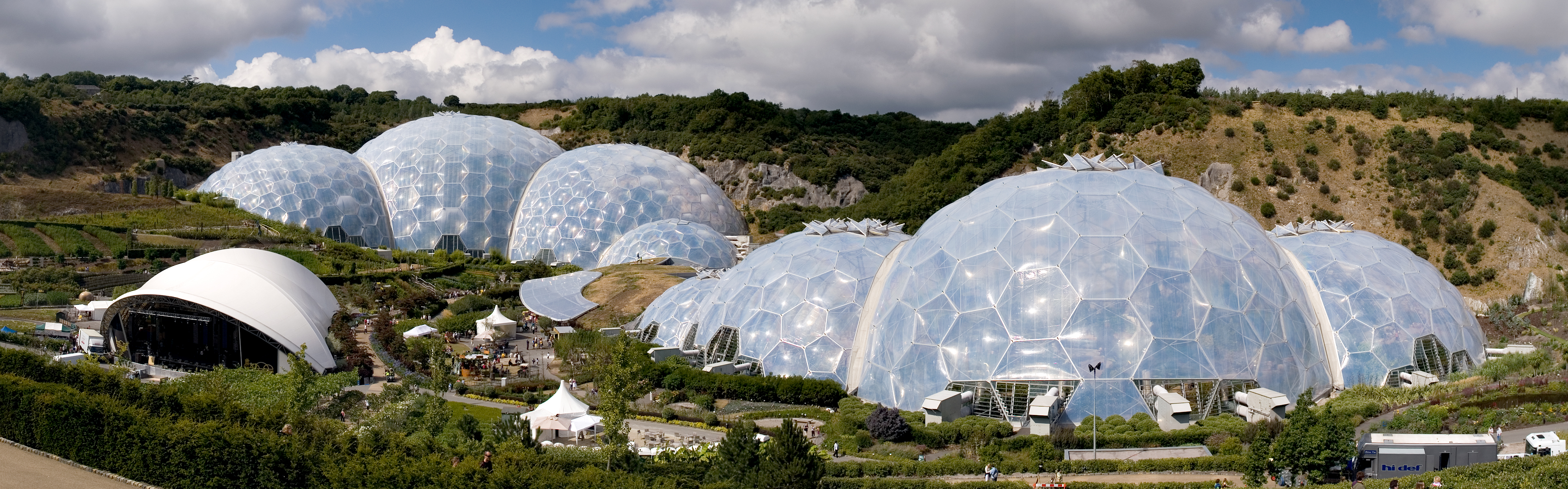
Geodesic domes of the Eden Project in the United Kingdom

The historicism of the 19th century led to many domes being re-translations of the great domes of the past, rather than further stylistic developments, especially in religious architecture. New production techniques allowed for cast iron and wrought iron to be produced both in larger quantities and at relatively low prices during the Industrial Revolution. Russia, which had large supplies of iron, has some of the earliest examples of the architectural use of iron. Excluding those that simply imitated multi-shell masonry, metal-framed domes such as the elliptical dome of the Royal Albert Hall in London (57 to 67 meters in diameter) and the circular dome of the Halle au Blé in Paris may represent the century's chief development of the simple domed form. Cast-iron domes were particularly popular in France.

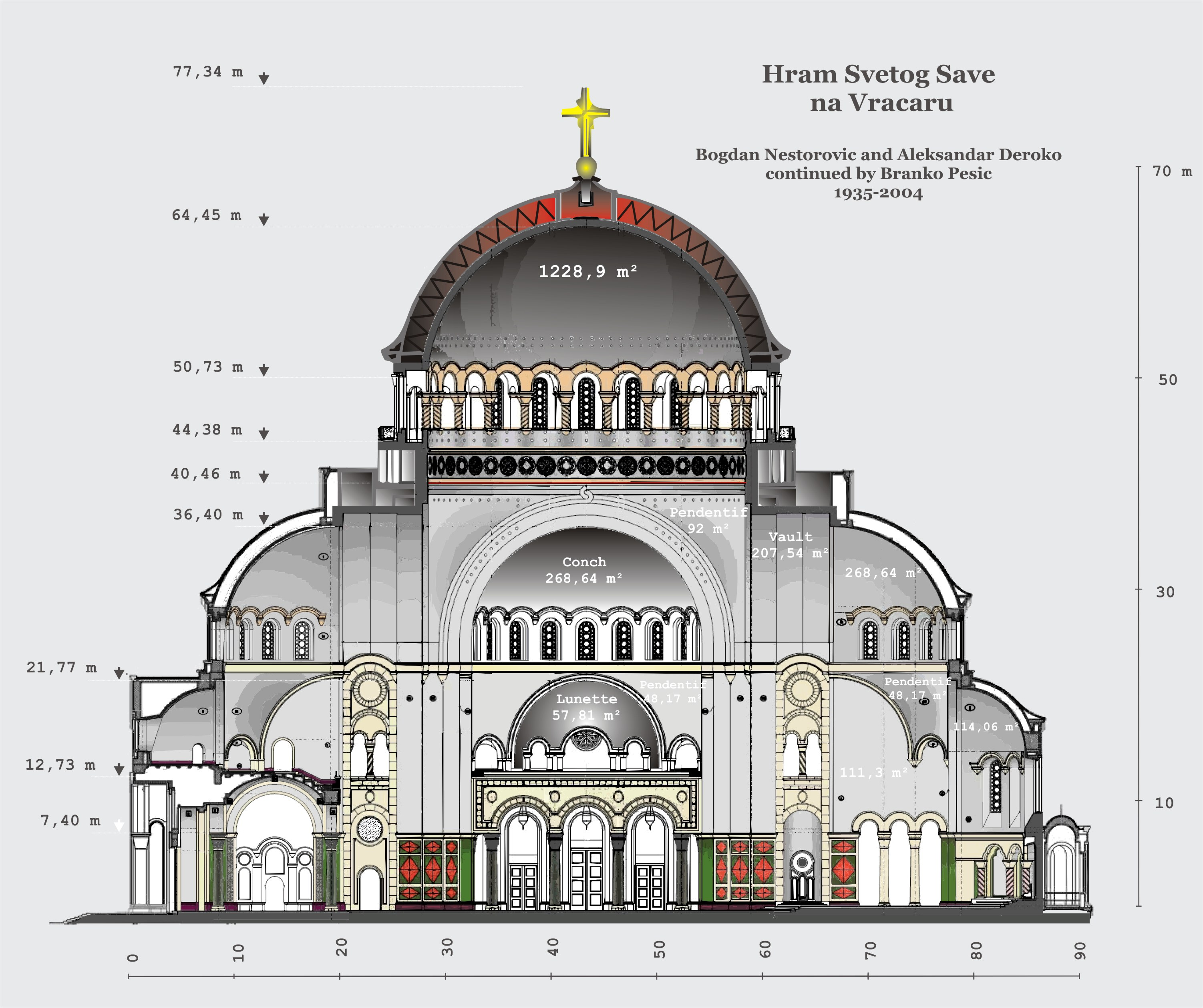
The concrete dome of Saint Sava's Church, Belgrade, was entirely built from prefabricated slabs. It was hydraulically lifted from the ground to 40 m height by lift-slab method. 1935–2004

The practice of building rotating domes for housing large telescopes was begun in the 19th century, with early examples using papier-mâché to minimize weight. Unique glass domes springing straight from ground level were used for hothouses and winter gardens. Elaborate covered shopping arcades included large glazed domes at their cross intersections. The large domes of the 19th century included exhibition buildings and functional structures such as gasometers and locomotive sheds. The "first fully triangulated framed dome" was built in Berlin in 1863 by Johann Wilhelm Schwedler and, by the start of the 20th century, similarly triangulated frame domes had become fairly common. Vladimir Shukhov was also an early pioneer of what would later be called gridshell structures, and in 1897 he employed them in domed exhibit pavilions at the All-Russia Industrial and Art Exhibition.

Domes built with steel and concrete were able to achieve very large spans. In the late 19th and early 20th centuries, the Guastavino family, a father-and-son team who worked on the eastern seaboard of the United States, further developed the masonry dome, using tiles set flat against the surface of the curve and fast-setting Portland cement, which allowed mild steel bar to be used to counteract tension forces. The thin domical shell was further developed with the construction by Walther Bauersfeld of two planetarium domes in Jena, Germany, in the early 1920s; these consisted of a triangulated frame of light steel bars and mesh covered by a thin layer of concrete. They are generally taken to be the first modern architectural thin shells and are also considered to be the first geodesic domes. Geodesic domes have been used for radar enclosures, greenhouses, housing, and weather stations. Architectural shells had their heyday in the 1950s and 1960s, peaking in popularity shortly before the widespread adoption of computers and the finite element method of structural analysis.

The first permanent air-supported membrane domes were the radar domes designed and built by Walter Bird after World War II. Their low cost eventually led to the development of permanent versions using Teflon-coated fiberglass, and by 1985 the majority of the domed stadiums around the world used this system. Tensegrity domes, patented by Buckminster Fuller in 1962, are membrane structures consisting of radial trusses made from steel cables under tension with vertical steel pipes spreading the cables into the truss form. They have been made circular, elliptical, and other shapes to cover stadiums from Korea to Florida. Tension membrane design has depended upon computers, and the increasing availability of powerful computers resulted in many developments being made in the last three decades of the 20th century. The higher expense of rigid large-span domes made them relatively rare, although rigidly moving panels is the most popular system for sports stadiums with retractable roofing.

== See also ==
- Lists of domes
- Cupola
- Vault (architecture)
- Rotunda (architecture)
- Monolithic dome
- Copper domes
- Dome car

== Bibliography ==
- William C. Allen (2001). "Senate Document 106-29: History of the United States Capitol: A Chronicle of Design, Construction, and Politics". U.S. Government Printing Office.
- Ambrose, Gavin; Harris, Paul; Stone, Sally (2008). The Visual Dictionary of Architecture (illustrated ed.). AVA Publishing. ISBN 978-2-940-37354-3.
- Ambrose, James; Tripeny, Patrick (2011). Building Structures (illustrated ed.). John Wiley & Sons. ISBN 978-0-470-54260-6.
- Arce, Ignacio (2006). Umayyad Arches, Vaults & Domes: Merging and Re-creation. Contributions to Early Islamic Construction History (conference paper) (PDF). Second International Congress on Construction History, Queens' College, Cambridge University; 29/03-02/04/2006. pp. 195–220.
- Arun, G. (2006). "Behaviour of Masonry Vaults and Domes: Geometrical Considerations". In Lourenço, P.B.; Roca, P.; Modena, C.; Agrawal, S. (eds.). Structural Analysis of Historical Constructions (PDF). pp. 299–306. Archived from the original (PDF) on October 23, 2020.
- Ashkan, Maryam; Ahmad, Yahaya (November 2009). "Persian Domes: History, Morphology, and Typologies". Archnet-IJAR (International Journal of Architectural Research). 3 (3): 98–115.
- Ashkan, Maryam; Ahmad, Yahaya (2010). "Discontinuous Double-shell Domes through Islamic eras in the Middle East and Central Asia: History, Morphology, Typologies, Geometry, and Construction" (PDF). Nexus Network Journal. 12 (2). Turin, Italy: Kim Williams Books: 287–319. doi:10.1007/s00004-010-0013-9.
- Bagliani, Stefano (May 2009). "The Architecture and Mechanics of Elliptical Domes" (PDF). Proceedings of the Third International Congress on Construction History, Cottbus. Archived from the original (PDF) on 2013-10-16.
- Barbieri, Patrizio (1998). "The acoustics of Italian opera houses and auditoriums (c. 1450–1900)". Recercare. 10. Fondazione Italiana per la Musica Antica (FIMA): 263–328. JSTOR 41692748.
- Bardill, Jonathan (2008). "Chapter II.7.1: Building Materials and Techniques". In Jeffreys, Elizabeth; Haldon, John; Cormack, Robin (eds.). The Oxford Handbook of Byzantine Studies. Oxford University Press. ISBN 978-0-19-925246-6.
- Barnish, S. J. B. (2007). The Ostrogoths from the Migration Period to the Sixth Century: an Ethnographic Perspective (Illustrated ed.). San Marino: The Boydell Press. ISBN 978-1-84383-074-0.
- Baumann, Dorothea; Haggh, Barbara (May 1990). "Musical Acoustics in the Middle Ages". Early Music. 18 (2): 199–210. doi:10.1093/em/xviii.2.199.
- Bellini, Federico (2017). "8 Vaults and Domes: Statics as an Art". In Mallgrave, Harry Francis; Payne, Alina (eds.). Companion to the History of Architecture, Volume I, Renaissance and Baroque Architecture. John Wiley & Sons, Ltd. pp. 1–33. doi:10.1002/9781118887226.wbcha009. ISBN 978-1-118-88722-6.
- Betts, Richard J. (March 1993). "Structural Innovation and Structural Design in Renaissance Architecture". Journal of the Society of Architectural Historians. 52 (1): 5–25. doi:10.2307/990755. JSTOR 990755.
- Blockley, David (2014). Structural Engineering: A Very Short Introduction. Oxford, UK: Oxford University Press. p. 144. ISBN 978-0-19-165208-0.
- Bloom, Jonathan M.; Blair, Sheila S., eds. (2009). Grove Encyclopedia of Islamic Art & Architecture: Three-Volume Set. Oxford University Press. ISBN 978-0-19-530991-1.
- Born, Wolfgang (April 1944). "The Introduction of the Bulbous Dome into Gothic Architecture and its Subsequent Development". Speculum. 19 (2): 208–221. doi:10.2307/2849071. JSTOR 2849071. S2CID 162699497.
- Bradshaw, Richard; Campbell, David; Gargari, Mousa; Mirmiran, Amir; Tripeny, Patrick (June 1, 2002). "Special Structures: Past, Present, and Future" (PDF). Journal of Structural Engineering. 128 (6): 691–709. doi:10.1061/(ASCE)0733-9445(2002)128:6(691).
- Brett, Peter (2012). Illustrated Dictionary of Building (Second ed.). Routledge. ISBN 978-1-135-13856-1.
- Bullough, Donald A. (1991). Carolingian Renewal: Sources and Heritage. Manchester University Press. ISBN 978-0-7190-3354-4.
- Burckhardt, Jacob (1987). Murray, Peter (ed.). The Architecture of the Italian Renaissance. Translated by James Palmes (illustrated, reprint ed.). Chicago: University of Chicago Press. ISBN 978-0-226-08049-9.
- Burden, Ernest (2012). Illustrated Dictionary of Architecture (Third ed.). McGraw Hill Professional. ISBN 978-0-071-77293-8.
- The Technical Educator: an Encyclopædia of Technical Education: Vol. 2. Cassell, Petter and Galpin. 1872.
- Cambon, Pierre (2022). "Dome Architecture in Ancient Asian Art and Seokguram Grotto: In comparison with Western Dome Constructions" (PDF). Korean Journal of Art History (313). Art History Association of Korea: 155–170.
- Capone, Mara; Lanzara, Emanuela (2019). Scan-to-BIM vs 3D ideal model HBIM: Parametric tools to study domes geometry (PDF). 2019 8th Intl. Workshop 3D-ARCH "3D Virtual Reconstruction and Visualization of Complex Architectures", 6–8 February 2019, Bergamo, Italy. Vol. 42. The International Archives of the Photogrammetry, Remote Sensing and Spatial Information Sciences. pp. 219–226.
- Charlier, Claude (1988). "After a While, Nothing Seems Strange in a Stadium with a 'Lid'". Smithsonian.
- Chen, W. F.; Lui, E. M. (2005). Handbook of Structural Engineering (2, illustrated, revised ed.). Boca Raton, Florida: CRC Press. p. 1768. ISBN 978-1-420-03993-1.
- Chilton, John (2000). When is a dome not a dome? - 20th-century lightweight and tensile domes. Annual Symposium of the Society of Architectural Historians of Great Britain. Society of Architectural Historians of Great Britain. pp. 131–146.
- Ching, Francis D. K.; Jarzombek, Mark; Prakash, Vikramaditya (2007). A Global History of Architecture (illustrated ed.). J. Wiley & Sons. ISBN 978-0-471-26892-5.
- Ching, Francis D. K. (2011). A Visual Dictionary of Architecture (2nd ed.). Hoboken, New Jersey: John Wiley & Sons. p. 336. ISBN 978-1-118-16049-7.
- Cipriani, Barbara; Lau, Wanda W. (2006). Construction Techniques in Medieval Cairo: the Domes of Mamluk Mausolea (1250 A.D. – 1517 A.D.) (PDF). Second International Congress on Construction History. Cambridge, UK. pp. 695–716.
- Clarke, Michael (2010). The Concise Oxford Dictionary of Art Terms. OUP Oxford. ISBN 978-0-199-56992-2.
- Coates, Michael; Brooker, Graeme; Stone, Sally (2009). The Visual Dictionary of Interior Architecture and Design. AVA Publishing. ISBN 978-2-940-37380-2.
- Coleman, Peter (2006). Shopping Environments (illustrated ed.). Routledge. ISBN 978-0-750-66001-3.
- Como, Mario (2013). Statics of Historic Masonry Constructions. Springer. ISBN 978-3-642-30131-5.
- Cowan, Henry J. (1977). "A History of Masonry and Concrete Domes in Building Construction". Building and Environment. 12 (1). Great Britain: Pergamon Press: 1–24. Bibcode:1977BuEnv..12....1C. doi:10.1016/0360-1323(77)90002-6. hdl:2027/mdp.39015041999635.
- Cowan, Henry J.; Smith, Peter R. (1998). Dictionary of Architectural and Building Technology (Third ed.). Taylor & Francis. ISBN 978-0-419-22280-4.
- Crandall, David P. (2000). The Place of Stunted Ironwood Trees: A Year in the Lives of the Cattle-herding Himba of Namibia. New York: Continuum International Publishing Group, Inc. ISBN 978-0-82641-270-6.
- Creswell, K. A. C. (January 1915). "Persian Domes before 1400 A.D.". The Burlington Magazine for Connoisseurs. 26 (142): 146–155. JSTOR 859853.
- Curl, James Stevens (2003). Classical Architecture: An Introduction to Its Vocabulary and Essentials, with a Select Glossary of Terms (illustrated, reprint, reissue ed.). W. W. Norton & Company. ISBN 978-0-393-73119-4.
- Curl, James Stevens; Wilson, Susan (2015). "Dome". A Dictionary of Architecture and Landscape Architecture (3rd ed.). Oxford University Press. pp. 236–237. doi:10.1093/acref/9780199674985.001.0001. ISBN 978-0-19-967498-5.
- Darling, Janina K. (2004). Architecture of Greece. Greenwood Publishing Group. ISBN 978-0-313-32152-8.
- Davies, Nikolas; Jokiniemi, Erkki (2008). Dictionary of Architecture and Building Construction. Routledge. ISBN 978-0-750-68502-3.
- Davies, Nikolas; Jokiniemi, Erkki (2012). Architect's Illustrated Pocket Dictionary. Routledge. ISBN 978-1-136-44406-7.
- Denny, Mark (2010). Super Structures: The Science of Bridges, Buildings, Dams, and Other Feats of Engineering. Baltimore: Johns Hopkins University Press. ISBN 978-0-8018-9436-7.
- Deva, Krishna (1988). "Mauryas Śuṅgas, Kāṇvas, Kuṣāṇas, Kṣatrapas". In Meister, Michael W.; Dhaky, M.A.; Deva, Krishna (eds.). Encyclopaedia of Indian Temple Architecture: Volume II, Part 1. Delhi: Oxford University Press. ISBN 0-19-562313-4.
- Dien, Albert E. (2007). Six Dynasties Civilization (Illustrated ed.). Yale University Press. ISBN 978-0-300-07404-8.
- Dimčić, Miloš (2011). "Structural Optimization of Grid Shells Based on Genetic Algorithms". Forschungsbericht 32 (PDF). Stuttgart: Institut für Tragkonstruktionen und Konstruktives Entwerfen. ISBN 978-3-922302-32-2. Archived from the original (PDF) on 2016-03-31.
- Dodge, Hazel (1984). Building Materials and Techniques in the Eastern Mediterranean from the Hellenistic Period to the Fourth Century AD (Thesis) (PhD Thesis ed.). Newcastle University. hdl:10443/868.
- Downey, Glanville (1946). "On Some Post-Classical Greek Architectural Terms". Transactions and Proceedings of the American Philological Association. 77: 22–34. doi:10.2307/283440. JSTOR 283440.
- Dror, Ben-Yosef (2011). "Area F – Soundings in the Fortifications". In Zertal, Adam (ed.). El-Ahwat, A Fortified Site from the Early Iron Age Near Nahal 'Iron, Israel: Excavations 1993–2000. BRILL. pp. 162–173. ISBN 978-9-004-17645-4.
- Dumser, Elisha Ann (2010). "Dome". In Gagarin, Michael; Fantham, Elaine (eds.). The Oxford Encyclopedia of Ancient Greece and Rome. Vol. 1. New York: Oxford University Press, Inc. pp. 436–438. ISBN 978-0-195-17072-6.
- Dupré, Judith (2001). Churches (illustrated ed.). HarperCollins. ISBN 978-0-06-019438-3.
- Earls, Michael W. (1971). "The Development of Structural Form in Franconian Rococo". In Malo, Paul (ed.). Essays to D. Kenneth Sargent. Syracuse, N.Y.: The School of Architecture, Syracuse University. pp. 127–139.
- Fernández, Santiago Huerta; Hernández-Ros, Ricardo Aroca (1989). "Masonry Domes: A Study on Proportion and Similarity" (PDF). 10 Years of Progress on Shell and Spatial Structures: 11–15 September 1989. 1.
- Fleming, John; Honour, Hugh; Pevsner, Nikolaus, eds. (1991). Dictionary of Architecture (4th ed.). Penguin Books. ISBN 978-0-14-051241-0.
- Fletcher, Sir Banister (1996). Dan Cruickshank (ed.). Sir Banister Fletcher's A History of Architecture (illustrated, reprint, 20th revised ed.). Architectural Press. ISBN 978-0-7506-2267-7.
- Frankl, Paul; Crossley, Paul (2000). Gothic Architecture (illustrated, revised ed.). Yale University Press. ISBN 978-0-300-08799-4.
- Freely, John; Çakmak, Ahmet S. (2004). Byzantine Monuments of Istanbul. New York: Cambridge University Press. ISBN 978-0-521-77257-0.
- Friedman, Noémi; Farkas, György (2011). "Roof Structures in Motion: On Retractable and Deployable Roof Structures Enabling Quick Construction or Adaptation to External Excitations" ( (PDF)). Concrete Structures. pp. 41–50. Archived from the original on 2013-05-14.
- Fuentes, P.; Huerta, S. (2010). "Islamic Domes of Crossed-arches: Origin, Geometry and Structural Behavior". In Chen, Baochun; Wei, Jiangang (eds.). ARCH'10 – 6th International Conference on Arch Bridges, October 11–13, 2010 (PDF). Fuzhou, Fujian, China: Fuzhou University. pp. 346–353. ISBN 978-953-7621-10-0. Archived from the original (PDF) on 2014-04-27.
- Fusco, Annarosa Cerutti; Villanni, Marcello (2003). "Pietro da Cortona's Domes between New Experimentations and Construction Knowledge". In Huerta, S. (ed.). Proceedings of the First International Congress on Construction History, Madrid, 20th–24th January 2003 (PDF). Madrid: I. Juan de Herrera. pp. 579–591. ISBN 978-84-9728-070-9.
- "The history of galvanotechnology in Russia (Russian)". Archived from the original on 2012-03-05.
- Gayle, Margot; Gayle, Carol (1998). Cast-iron architecture in America: the significance of James Bogardus (illustrated ed.). W. W. Norton & Company. ISBN 978-0-393-73015-9.
- Giustina, Irene (2003). On the art and the culture of domes. Construction in Milan and Lombardy in the late sixteenth and in the first half of the seventeenth century (PDF). First International Congress on Construction History. Madrid: Sociedad Española de Historia de la Construcción. pp. 1033–1042.
- Gonzalo, José Carlos Palacios; Alkadi, Rana Munir (2018). "Muqarnas Domes and Cornices in the Maghreb and Andalusia" (PDF). Nexus Network Journal. 20 (1). Springer: 95–123. doi:10.1007/s00004-017-0367-3.
- Goodwin, Godfrey (1971). A History of Ottoman Architecture. London: Thames & Hudson. ISBN 080181202X.
  - Goodwin, Godfrey (2003). A history of Ottoman architecture. London: Thames and Hudson. ISBN 9780500274293.
- Gorse, Christopher; Johnston, David; Pritchard, Martin (2012). A Dictionary of Construction, Surveying, and Civil Engineering. OUP Oxford. ISBN 978-0-191-04494-6.
- Grabar, Oleg (December 1963). "The Islamic Dome, Some Considerations". Journal of the Society of Architectural Historians. 22 (4): 191–198. doi:10.2307/988190. JSTOR 988190.
- Grabar, Oleg (March 1990). "From Dome of Heaven to Pleasure Dome". Journal of the Society of Architectural Historians. 49 (1): 15–21. doi:10.2307/990496. JSTOR 990496.
- Grupico, Theresa (2011). "The Dome in Christian and Islamic Sacred Architecture" (PDF). The Forum on Public Policy. 2011 (3): 14. Archived from the original (PDF) on November 29, 2014.
- Guedes, Pedro, ed. (2016). The Macmillan Encyclopaedia of Architecture & Technological Change. Springer. ISBN 978-1-349-04697-3.
- Gye, D. H. (1988). "Arches and Domes in Iranian Islamic Buildings: An Engineer's Perspective". Iran. 26: 129–144. doi:10.2307/4299807. JSTOR 4299807.
- Hamilton, George Heard (1983). The Art and Architecture of Russia (illustrated ed.). Yale University Press. ISBN 978-0-300-05327-2.
- Harris, Cyril M. (2005). Dictionary of Architecture and Construction (Fourth ed.). McGraw Hill Professional. ISBN 978-0-071-58901-7.
- Harris, Cyril M. (2013). Illustrated Dictionary of Historic Architecture (reprint, revised ed.). Courier Corporation. ISBN 978-0-486-13211-2.
- Hassan, Ahmad Sanusi; Mazloomi, Mehrdad; Omer, Spahic (2010). "Sectional Analysis of Pendentive Dome Mosques During Ottoman Era" (PDF). Canadian Social Science. 6 (5): 124–136. Archived from the original (PDF) on 2015-02-22.
- Heyman, Jacques (1997). The Stone Skeleton: Structural Engineering of Masonry Architecture (illustrated, reprint ed.). Cambridge University Press. ISBN 978-0-521-62963-8.
- Hill, Donald Routledge (1996). A history of engineering in classical and medieval times (Illustrated ed.). New York: Routledge. ISBN 978-0-415-15291-4.
- Hillenbrand, Robert (1994). Islamic Architecture: Form, Function, and Meaning. New York: Columbia University Press. ISBN 978-0-231-10133-2.
- Hitchcock, Don. "Mezhirich – Mammoth Camp".
- Höcker, Christoph (2000). Architecture. Laurence King Publishing. ISBN 978-1-856-69159-8.
- Hourihane, Colum, ed. (2012). The Grove Encyclopedia of Medieval Art and Architecture. Oxford University Press. ISBN 978-0-19-539536-5.
- Howard, Deborah (1991). "Venice and Islam in the Middle Ages: Some Observations on the Question of Architectural Influence". Architectural History. 34: 59–74. doi:10.2307/1568594. JSTOR 1568594. S2CID 192359421.
- Huerta, Santigo (2007). "Oval Domes: History, Geometry and Mechanics". Nexus Network Journal. Vol. 9. pp. 211–248. doi:10.1007/978-3-7643-8699-3_4. ISBN 978-3-7643-8444-9.
- Ibrāhīm, Laila ʿAlī (1975). "The Transitional Zones of Domes in Cairene Architecture". Kunst des Orients. 10 (1): 5–23. JSTOR 20752454.
- Jannasch, E. (2016). "Beyond the funicular: Exploiting untapped petentials in masonry construction". In Cruz, Paulo J. da Sousa (ed.). Structures and Architecture: Beyond their Limits. CRC Press. pp. 745–752. ISBN 978-1-317-54996-3.
- Jeffery, George (2010). A Brief Description of the Holy Sepulchre Jerusalem and Other Christian Churches in the Holy City: With Some Account of the Mediaeval Copies of the Holy Sepulchre Surviving in Europe (reprint (1919) ed.). Cambridge University Press. ISBN 978-1-108-01604-9.
- Johnson, Mark J. (2009). The Roman Imperial Mausoleum in Late Antiquity (1 ed.). Cambridge University Press. ISBN 978-0-521-51371-5.
- Karydis, Nikolaos D. (2012). "The Early Byzantine Domed Basilicas of West Asia Minor. An Essay in Graphic Reconstruction" (PDF). Late Antique Archaeology. 9 (1): 357–381. doi:10.1163/22134522-12340013. ISBN 9789004309777. Archived from the original (PDF) on 2015-05-29.
- Kayili, Mutbul (2005). "Acoustic Solutions in Classic Ottoman Architecture" (PDF). FSTC (Foundation for Science Technology and Civilisation) Limited. pp. 1–15. 4087. Archived from the original (PDF) on 2021-08-28.
- Kern, Chris. "Jefferson's Dome at Monticello".
- Kies, Lisa. "Russian Church Design". Archived from the original on July 1, 2012.
- Kim, Young Jae (1960). "Reconsidering the Symbolic Meaning of the Stupa" (PDF). Bulletin de l'École Française d'Extrême-Orient. 50 (1): 159–168.
- Kohlmaier, Georg; Von Sartory, Barna (1991). Houses of Glass: a Nineteenth-Century Building Type. Translated by John C. Harvey (illustrated ed.). MIT Press. ISBN 978-0-262-61070-4.
- Krautheimer, Richard (1980). "Success and Failure in Late Antique Church Planning". In Weitzmann, Kurt (ed.). Age of Spirituality: A Symposium. New York: Metropolitan Museum of Art. pp. 121–140. ISBN 978-0-87099-229-2.
- Krautheimer, Richard (1986). Early Christian and Byzantine Architecture (4 ed.). Yale University Press. ISBN 978-0-300-05294-7.
- Kruft, Hanno-Walter (1994). History of Architectural Theory (illustrated, reprint ed.). Princeton Architectural Press. ISBN 978-1-568-98010-2.
- Kuban, Doğan (1985). Muslim Religious Architecture, Part II. Leiden, The Netherlands: E. J. Brill. ISBN 978-90-04-07084-4.
- Kuban, Doğan (1987). "The Style of Sinan's Domed Structures". Muqarnas. 4: 72–97. doi:10.2307/1523097. JSTOR 1523097.
- Kuiper, Kathleen (2011). The Culture of China. The Rosen Publishing Group. ISBN 978-1-61530-183-6.
- Kurtz, Jean-Paul (2004). Dictionary of Civil Engineering: English-French. Springer Science & Business Media. ISBN 978-0-306-48317-2.
- Lancaster, Lynne C. (2005). Concrete Vaulted Construction in Imperial Rome: Innovations in Context (illustrated ed.). Hong Kong: Cambridge University Press. ISBN 978-0-521-84202-0.
- Langmead, Donald; Garnaut, Christine (2001). Encyclopedia of Architectural and Engineering Feats (3rd ed.). ABC-CLIO. ISBN 978-1-57607-112-0.
- Larson, Olga Popovic; Tyas, Andy (2003). Conceptual Structural Design: Bridging the Gap Between Architects and Engineers (illustrated, reprint ed.). Thomas Telford. ISBN 978-0-72773-235-4.
- Lehmann, Karl (1989) [1945]. "The Dome of Heaven". In Kleinbauer, W. Eugène (ed.). Modern Perspectives in Western Art History: An Anthology of Twentieth-Century Writings on the Visual Arts (Medieval Academy Reprints for Teaching). Vol. 25. University of Toronto Press. pp. 227–270. ISBN 978-0-8020-6708-1.
- Leick, Gwendolyn, ed. (2003). "Dome". A Dictionary of Ancient Near Eastern Architecture. London and New York: Taylor & Francis. ISBN 978-0-203-19965-7.
- "Hong Kong Museum of History: Branch Museums: "Lei Cheng Uk Han Tomb"". Leisure and Cultural Services Department. January 9, 2014.
- Levy, Matthys; Salvadori, Mario (2002). Why buildings Fall Down: How Structures Fail (illustrated, reprint ed.). W. W. Norton & Company. ISBN 978-0-393-31152-5.
- Lippincott, Kristen (2008). DK Eyewitness Books: Astronomy. Penguin. ISBN 978-0-756-64349-2.
- Lucore, Sandra K. (2009). "Archimedes, the North Baths at Morgantina, and Early Developments in Vaulted Construction". In Kosso, Cynthia; Scott, Anne (eds.). The nature and function of water, baths, bathing, and hygiene from antiquity through the Renaissance. Leiden, The Netherlands: Brill. pp. 43–59. ISBN 978-9-004-17357-6.
- MacDonald, William (1958). "Some Implications of Later Roman Construction" (PDF). Journal of the Society of Architectural Historians. 17 (4): 2–8. doi:10.2307/987944. JSTOR 987944.
- Mainstone, Rowland J. (2000). Domes: A Structural Overview. Annual Symposium of the Society of Architectural Historians of Great Britain. Society of Architectural Historians of Great Britain. pp. 1–14. Archived from the original on 2020-07-29.
- Mainstone, Rowland J. (2001). Developments in Structural Form (2 ed.). Architectural Press. ISBN 978-0-7506-5451-7.
- Makowski, Z. S. (1962). "Braced Domes, Their History, Modern Trends and Recent Developments". Architectural Science Review. 5 (2): 62–79. doi:10.1080/00038628.1962.9696050.
- Marche, Jordan (2005). Theaters of Time and Space: American Planetaria, 1930–1970. Rutgers University Press. ISBN 978-0-813-53766-5.
- Mark, Robert; Billington, David P. (1989). "Structural Imperative and the Origin of New Form". Technology and Culture. 30 (2): 300–329. doi:10.2307/3105106. JSTOR 3105106. S2CID 111941107.
- Marrucchi, Giulia; Belcari, Riccardo (2007). Art of the Middle Ages: Masterpieces in Painting, Sculpture and Architecture. New York: Barnes & Noble, Inc. ISBN 978-0-7607-8887-5.
- Mediati, Domenico; Colistra, Daniele; Arena, Marinella (2020). "Domes in the central Mediterranean. Geometric syncretism and cultural hybridizations". Disegnarecon. 13 (25): 1–20. doi:10.20365/disegnarecon.25.2020.10. ISSN 1828-5961.
- McClendon, Charles B. (2005). The Origins of Medieval Architecture: Building in Europe, A.D 600–900 (illustrated ed.). Yale University Press. ISBN 978-0-300-10688-6.
- McNeil, Ian (2002). An Encyclopedia of the History of Technology (revised ed.). Taylor & Francis. ISBN 978-0-203-19211-5.
- McVey, Kathleen E. (1983). "The Domed Church as Microcosm: Literary Roots of an Architectural Symbol". Dumbarton Oaks Papers. 37: 91–121. doi:10.2307/1291479. JSTOR 1291479.
- Melaragno, Michele G. (1991). An Introduction to Shell Structures: the Art and Science of Vaulting (softcover ed.). New York: Van Nostrand Reinhold. ISBN 978-1-4757-0225-5.
- Michell, George; Zebrowski, Mark (1987). The New Cambridge History of India: Architecture and Art of the Deccan Sultanates. Cambridge University Press. ISBN 978-0-521-56321-5.
- Miller, Judith; Clinch, Tim (1998). Classic Style (illustrated ed.). Simon and Schuster. ISBN 978-0-684-84997-3.
- Minke, Gernot (2012). Building with Earth: Design and Technology of a Sustainable Architecture (3rd; revised ed.). Berlin: Walter de Gruyter. ISBN 978-3-034-60872-5.
- Mitchell, James H. (1985). "The Noble Dome". The Antioch Review. 43 (3): 261–271. doi:10.2307/4611482. JSTOR 4611482.
- Moffett, Marian; Fazio, Michael W.; Wodehouse, Lawrence (2003). A World History of Architecture (illustrated ed.). London: Laurence King Publishing. ISBN 978-1-856-69371-4.
- Murray, Linda; Murray, Peter; Jones, Tom Devonshire, eds. (2013). The Oxford Dictionary of Christian Art and Architecture (Second ed.). Oxford University Press. ISBN 978-0-199-68027-6.
- Needham, Joseph; Gwei-Djen, Lu (1971) [1962]. Science and Civilisation in China: Physics and Physical Technology, Volume 4. Cambridge University Press. ISBN 978-0-521-07060-7.
- "The Catholic Encyclopedia". New Advent.
- Newman, John; Pevnser, Nikolaus, eds. (1972). The Buildings of England: Dorset. Yale University Press. ISBN 978-0-300-09598-2.
- Nickel, Lukas (2015). "Bricks in Ancient China and the Question of Early Cross-Asian Interaction". Arts Asiatiques. 70. École française d'Extrême-Orient: 49–62. doi:10.3406/arasi.2015.1883. JSTOR 26358183.
- Nobile, Marco Rosario; Bares, Maria Mercedes (2015). "The use of 'false vaults' in 18th century buildings of Sicily". Construction History. 30 (1): 53–70. JSTOR 44215897.
- Nuttgens, Patrick (1997). The Story of Architecture. Hong Kong: Phaidon Press Limited. ISBN 978-0-7148-3616-4.
- Ochsendork, John; Freeman, Michael (2010). Guastavino Vaulting: The Art of Structural Tile (illustrated ed.). Princeton Architectural Press. ISBN 978-1-56898-741-5.
- O'Kane, Bernard (1995). "Domes". Encyclopædia Iranica.
- Osborne, R. Armstrong L. (2004). "The troubles with cupolas" (PDF). Acta Carsologica. 33 (2). Archived from the original (PDF) on 2021-06-24.
- Ousterhout, Robert G. (2008). Master Builders of Byzantium (paperback ed.). Philadelphia: University of Pennsylvania Museum of Archaeology and Anthropology. ISBN 978-1-934536-03-2.
- Ousterhout, Robert (2008). "Chapter II.7.2: Churches and Monasteries". In Jeffreys, Elizabeth; Haldon, John; Cormack, Robin (eds.). The Oxford Handbook of Byzantine Studies. Oxford University Press. ISBN 978-0-19-925246-6.
- Overy, R. J. (2004). The Dictators: Hitler's Germany and Stalin's Russia (illustrated ed.). New York: W. W. Norton & Company. ISBN 978-0-393-02030-4.
- Palmer, Douglas; Pettitt, Paul; Bahn, Paul G. (2005). Unearthing the past: the great archaeological discoveries that have changed history (Illustrated ed.). Globe Pequot. ISBN 978-1-59228-718-5.
- Palmer, Allison Lee (2009). The A to Z of Architecture. Scarecrow Press. ISBN 978-0-810-87058-1.
- Palmer, Allison Lee (2016). Historical Dictionary of Architecture (Second ed.). Rowman & Littlefield. ISBN 978-1-442-26309-3.
- Palmisano, F.; Totaro, A. (2010). "Load path method in the interpretation of dome behavior". In Cruz, Paulo J. da Sousa (ed.). Structures and Architecture. CRC Press. pp. 519–520. ISBN 978-1-439-86297-1.
- Parker, Sybil P., ed. (2003). McGraw-Hill Dictionary of Scientific and Technical Terms (Sixth ed.). McGraw-Hill Education. ISBN 978-0-070-42313-8.
- Parker, John Henry (2012). A Concise Dictionary of Architectural Terms. Courier Corporation. ISBN 978-0-486-14291-3.
- Pavani, Raffaella (2020). "Chapter 28 Challenging Mathematical Insights into Masonry Domes Over the Centuries". In Abali, Bilen Emek; Giorgio, Ivan (eds.). Vol 130 Developments and Novel Approaches in Nonlinear Solid Body Mechanics. Advanced Structured Materials. Vol. 130. Springer. pp. 469–479. doi:10.1007/978-3-030-50460-1_28. ISBN 978-3-030-50460-1.
- Pavlovic, Milorad; Reccia, Emanuele; Cecchi, Antonella (2014). Limit analysis of masonry domes: the case of Hagia Sophia and Anime Sante. MONUBASIN - 9th International Symposium on the Conservation of Monuments in the Mediterrean Basin. Ankara, Turkey.
- Peterson, Andrew (1996). The Dictionary of Islamic Architecture. Routledge. ISBN 978-0-203-20387-3.
- Petersen, Andrew (1996). "A preliminary report on three Muslim shrines in Palestine" (PDF). Levant. 28 (1). Taylor & Francis: 97–113. doi:10.1179/lev.1996.28.1.97.
- Pevny, Olenka Z. (2009). "The Encrypted Narrative of Reconstructed Cossack Baroque Forms". Harvard Ukrainian Studies. 31 (1): 471–519. JSTOR 41756512.
- Pevsner, Nikolaus (1978). Derbyshire. Revised by Elizabeth Williamson (illustrated, reprint ed.). Yale University Press. ISBN 978-0-140-71008-3.
- Porter, Arthur Kingsley (1928). Spanish Romanesque Sculpture, Volume 1 (illustrated ed.). Hacker Art Books.
- Porter, Arthur Kingsley (1969) [1st Pub. 1928]. Spanish Romanesque Sculpture, Volume 1 (illustrated ed.). Hacker Art Books. ISBN 9780878170333.
- Ramaswany, G. S.; Eekhout, Mick (2002). Analysis, Design and Construction of Steel Space Frames (illustrated, reprint ed.). London, UK: Thomas Telford, Ltd. p. 242. ISBN 978-0-727-73014-5.
- Rasch, Jürgen (1985). "Die Kuppel in der römischen Architektur. Entwicklung, Formgebung, Konstruktion". Architectura. 15: 117–139.
- Rizzoni, Giovanni (2009). "The Form of Parliaments & European Identity". In Rorato, Laura; Saunders, Anna (eds.). The Essence and the Margin: National Identities and Collective Memories in Contemporary European Culture. The Netherlands: Rodopi. pp. 183–198. ISBN 978-9-042-02571-4.
- Robison, Elwin C. (December 1991). "Optics and Mathematics in the Domed Churches of Guarino Guarini". Journal of the Society of Architectural Historians. 50 (4): 384–401. doi:10.2307/990663. JSTOR 990663.
- Rosser, John H. (2011). Historical Dictionary of Byzantium (2 ed.). Scarecrow Press. ISBN 978-0-810-87477-0.
- Rovero, Luisa; Tonietti, Ugo (2012). "Structural behaviour of earthen corbelled domes in the Aleppo's region". Materials and Structures. 45 (1–2): 171–184. doi:10.1617/s11527-011-9758-1. S2CID 137418637.
- Saka, M. P. (2007). "Optimum geometry design of geodesic domes using harmony search algorithm". Advances in Structural Engineering. 10 (6): 595–606. doi:10.1260/136943307783571445. hdl:11511/63569. S2CID 111176744.
- Salvadori, M.G. (1987). "The Anasazi cribbed domes". Building and Environment. 22 (3). Elsevier Ltd: 233–235. Bibcode:1987BuEnv..22..233S. doi:10.1016/0360-1323(87)90011-4. ISSN 0360-1323.
- Saylor, Henry H. (1994). Dictionary of Architecture (reprint ed.). John Wiley & Sons. ISBN 978-0-471-75601-9.
- Schütz, Bernhard (2002). Great Cathedrals (illustrated ed.). Harry N. Abrams, Inc. ISBN 978-0-810-93297-5.
- Sear, Frank (1983). Roman Architecture (revised ed.). Cornell University Press. ISBN 978-0-8014-9245-7. "Roman architecture."
- Skempton, A. W. (2002). A biographical dictionary of civil engineers in Great Britain and Ireland: 1500–1830 (illustrated ed.). Thomas Telford. ISBN 978-0-7277-2939-2.
- "About Russian Domes and Cupolas". skypalace.org. Archived from the original on 2011-07-28.
- Smith, Earl Baldwin (1950). The Dome: A Study in the History of Ideas. Princeton, NJ: Princeton University Press. ISSN 0079-5208.
- Smith, Earl Baldwin (1978) [1st Pub. 1950]. The Dome: A Study in the History of Ideas. Princeton, N.J.: Princeton University Press. ISBN 978-0-691-03875-9.
- Spiers, Richard Phené (1911). "Vault" . In Chisholm, Hugh (ed.). Encyclopædia Britannica. Vol. 27 (11th ed.). Cambridge University Press. pp. 956–961.
- Steinhardt, Nancy Shatzman (2018). "China's Other Early Mosques". China's Early Mosques. Edinburgh University Press. pp. 75–91. ISBN 978-1-4744-7285-2. JSTOR 10.3366/j.ctvxcrp18.11.
- Stephenson, Davis; Hammond, Victoria; Davi, Keith F. (2005). Visions of Heaven: the Dome in European Architecture (illustrated ed.). Princeton Architectural Press. ISBN 978-1-56898-549-7.
- Stewart, Charles Anthony (2008). Domes of Heaven: The Domed Basilicas of Cyprus (illustrated ed.). ProQuest LLC. ISBN 978-0-549-75556-2.
- Tabbaa, Yasser (1985). "The Muqarnas Dome: Its Origin and Meaning". Muqarnas. 3: 61–74. doi:10.2307/1523084. JSTOR 1523084.
- Tappin, Stuart (2003). "The Structural Development of Masonry Domes in India". In Huerta, S. (ed.). Proceedings of the First International Congress on Construction History, Madrid, 20th–24th January 2003 (PDF). Madrid: I. Juan de Herrera. pp. 1941–1952. ISBN 978-84-9728-070-9. Archived from the original (PDF) on 2009-12-11.
- Taylor, Rabun (1996). "A Literary and Structural Analysis of the First Dome on Justinian's Hagia Sophia, Constantinople". Muqarnas. 55 (1). University of California Press on behalf of the Society of Architectural Historians: 66–78. JSTOR 991056.
- Trachtenberg, Marvin; Hyman, Isabelle (1986). Architecture, from Prehistory to Post-modernism: The Western Tradition. H.N. Abrams. ISBN 978-0-810-91077-5.
- Tsan-wing, Ng; Kin-wah, Leung (2001). Deformation Survey for the Preservation of Lei Cheng Uk Han Tomb (PDF). The 10th FIG International Symposium on Deformation Measurements. Session VIII: Structural Deformations. 19 – 22 March 2001. Orange, California, US. pp. 294–301. ISBN 978-0-86078-686-3. Archived from the original (PDF) on 6 February 2004.
- Wallis, Kendall (2010). "Bearing Bandmann's Meaning: A Translator's Introduction by Kendall Willis". In Bandmann, Günter (ed.). Early Medieval Architecture as Bearer of Meaning. Translated by Kendall Wallis. Columbia University Press. ISBN 978-0-231-50172-9.
- Ward, Clarence (1915). Mediaeval Church Vaulting (illustrated ed.). Princeton: Princeton University Press.
- Wilkie, David S.; Morelli, Gilda A. (2000). "Forest Foragers: A Day in the Life of Efe Pygmies in the Democratic Republic of Congo". Cultural Survival Quarterly. 24 (3).
- Winter, Frederick E. (2006). Studies in Hellenistic Architecture (illustrated ed.). Toronto, Canada: University of Toronto Press. ISBN 978-0-8020-3914-9.
- Wittkower, Rudolf (1989) [1st Pub. 1963]. "S. Maria della Salute: Scenographic Architecture and the Venetian Baroque". In Kleinbauer, W. Eugène (ed.). Modern Perspectives in Western Art History: An Anthology of Twentieth-Century Writings on the Visual Arts (Medieval Academy Reprints for Teaching). Vol. 25. University of Toronto Press. pp. 165–192. ISBN 978-0-8020-6708-1.
- Wittkower, Rudolf (1999). Art and Architecture in Italy 1600–1750: III. Late Baroque. Revised by Joseph Conners and Jennifer Montagu (6th ed.). Yale University Press. ISBN 978-0-300-07941-8.
- Wright, G.R.H. (2009). Ancient Building Technology, Volume 3: Construction (2 Vols) (illustrated ed.). BRILL. ISBN 978-9-004-17745-1.
- Yaghan, Mohammad Ali Jalal (2003). "Gadrooned-Dome's Muqarnas-Corbel: Analysis and Decoding Historical Drawings". Architectural Science Review. 46 (1): 69–88. doi:10.1080/00038628.2003.9696966. S2CID 109278304.
- Zagraevsky, Sergey. "The shapes of domes of ancient Russian churches (Russian)". RusArch.ru. Archived from the original on 2013-01-16.
