= Khatib =

Person who delivers an Islamic sermon

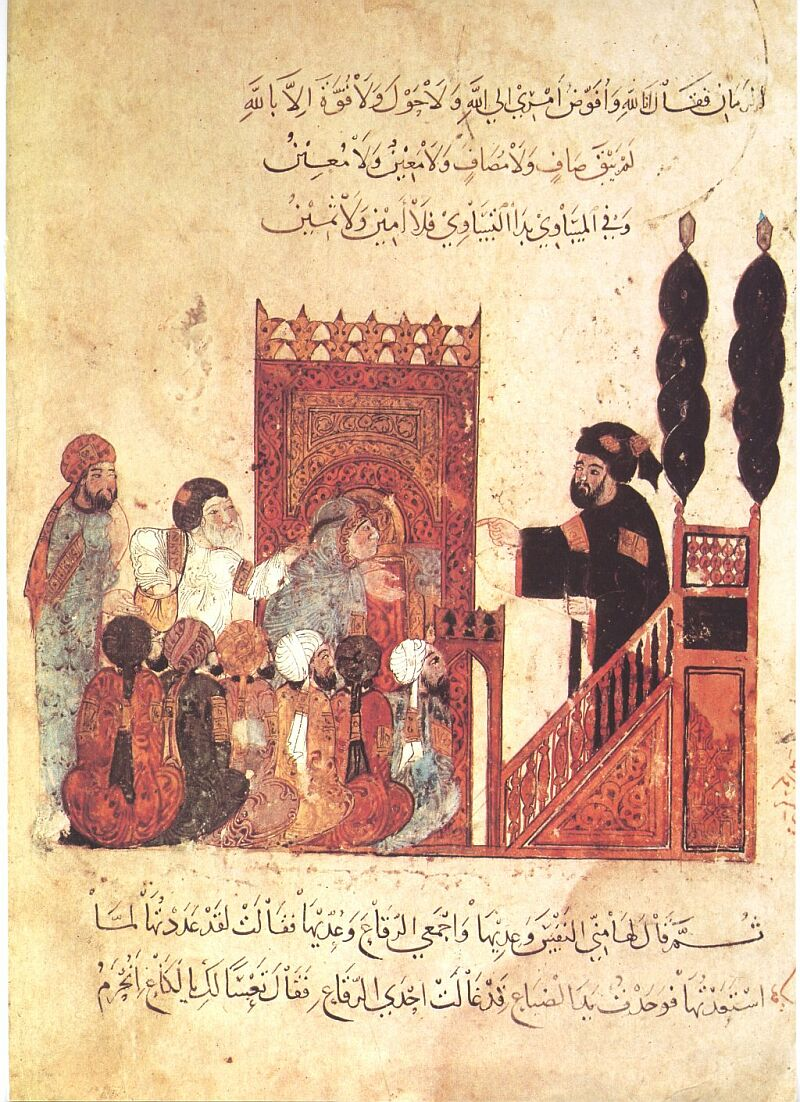
Abbasid Qadi delivers Khutbah in Mosque on the Minbar. (Khutbah is delivered by Qadis and Imams)

In Islam, a khatib or khateeb (Arabic: خطيب, romanized: khaṭīb) is a person who delivers the sermon (khuṭbah) (literally "narration"), during the Friday prayer and Eid prayers.

The khatib is usually the prayer leader (imam), but the two roles can be played by different people. The khatib should be knowledgeable of how to lead the prayer and be competent in delivering the sermon; however, there are no requirements of eligibility to become a khatib beyond being an adult Muslim. Muslims believe the khatib has to be male, as women do not lead Friday prayer.

Khutubah are delivered by men. Edina Leković gave the inaugural speech at the Women's Mosque in California, United States, in 2015.

== See also ==
- Al-Khatib
- Khattab
- İmam Hatip school
