= List of mosques in China =

This is a list of notable mosques in China. A mosque is a place of worship for followers of the religion of Islam. The first mosque in China was the Huaisheng Mosque in Guangzhou, built during the Tang dynasty in 627 CE. In of 2014 there were 39,135 mosques in China, in 2009 an estimated 25,000 of these were in Xinjiang, a north-west autonomous region, having a high density of one mosque per 500 Muslims.

In China, mosques are called Qīng Zhēn Sì (清真寺, "Temples of the Pure Truth"), a name which was also used by Chinese Jews for synagogues. Other names include Huí Huí Táng (回回堂, "Hui people's hall"), Huí Huí Sì (回回寺, "Hui people's temple"), Lǐ Bài Sì (礼拜寺, "Temple of worship"), Zhēn Jiào Sì (真教寺, "Temple of the True Teaching") or Qīng Jìng Sì (清净寺, "Pure and clean temple").

During the Qing dynasty, at the mosque entrance of Hui Mosques, a tablet was placed upon which "Huáng Dì Wàn Suì, Wàn Suì, Wàn Wàn Suì" (皇帝萬歲，萬歲，萬萬歲) was inscribed, which means, "The Emperor, may he live forever". Wansui means Ten thousand years, which means forever in Chinese. Westerners traveling in China noted the presence of these tablets at mosques in Yunnan and Ningbo.

Most mosques have certain aspects in common with each other however as with other regions Chinese Islamic architecture reflects the local architecture in its style. China is renowned for its beautiful mosques, which resemble temples. However, in western China the mosques resemble those of Iran and Central Asia, with tall, slender minarets, curvy arches and dome shaped roofs, as well as the unique multi-layered portals. In northwest China where the Chinese Hui have built their mosques, there is a combination of eastern and western styles. The mosques have flared Buddhist style roofs set in walled courtyards entered through archways with miniature domes and minarets.

== List of iconic mosques ==
Name	Images	City or District	Province or Municipality	Year	Remarks
Huaisheng Mosque		Guangzhou	Guangdong	627	considered to be the oldest mosque in China
Xianxian Mosque		Guangzhou	Guangdong	7th century	
Great Mosque of Xi'an		Xi'an	Shaanxi	742	largest and oldest mosque in Shaanxi province
Niujie Mosque		Beijing	Beijing	996	oldest and largest mosque in Beijing, as of 2024, most of the mosque is closed for renovations with a small prayer hall still active in it.
Qingjing Mosque		Quanzhou	Fujian	1009	Qīng Jìng Sì, oldest mosque in Fujian
Phoenix Mosque		Hangzhou	Zhejiang	1281	oldest mosque in Hangzhou
Id Kah Mosque		Kashgar	Xinjiang	1442	One of the oldest and most iconic mosques in Xinjiang, prayer access is limited
Tongxin Great Mosque		Tongxin	Ningxia	ca.1400	Tóng Xīn Qīng Zhēn Dà Sì
Dongguan Mosque		Xining	Qinghai	1380	
Jinan Great Southern Mosque		Jinan	Shandong	1295	Jì Nán Qīng Zhēn Nán Dà Sì
Huangcheng Mosque		Chengdu	Sichuan	16th century	largest mosque in Sichuan province
Songjiang Mosque		Shanghai (Songjiang district)	Shanghai	1391	Oldest mosque in Shanghai
Dongsi Mosque		Beijing	Beijing	1346	
Xianhe Mosque (Crane Mosque)		Yangzhou	Jiangsu	1275	1390 (reconstruction)
Huasi Mosque		Linxia	Gansu	1487	Huá Sì Qīng Zhēn Sì
Emin Minaret Mosque		Turpan	Xinjiang		has the tallest minaret in China
Bukui Mosque		Qiqihar	Heilongjiang	1684	Bo Kuí Qīng Zhēn Sì
Great Mosque of Hohhot		Hohhot	Inner Mongolia	1693	Hū Hé Hào Tè Qīng Zhēn Dà Sì
Afaq Khoja Mausoleum		Haohan	Xinjiang	1640	Ā Bā Hé Jiā Má Zhá, the mausoleum includes a mosque
Najiaying Mosque		Yuxi	Yunnan	1370	Nà Jiā Yíng Qīng Zhēn Sì
Nanning Mosque		Nanning	Guangxi	1707	Nán Níng Qīng Zhēn Sì
Daowai Mosque		Daowai	Harbin	1897	Dào Wài Qīng Zhēn Sì
Dunhuang Mosque		Dunhuang	Gansu	1917	Dūn Huáng Qīng Zhēn Sì
Fuyou Road Mosque		Huangpu	Shanghai	1870	Fú Yòu Lù Qīng Zhēn Sì
Lhasa Great Mosque		Lhasa	Tibet	1716	Lā Sà Qīng Zhēn Dà Sì
Khotan Mosque		Hotan	Xinjiang	1870	Hé Tián Qīng Zhēn Sì
Xiaotaoyuan Mosque		Huangpu	Shanghai	1917	Xiǎo Táo Yuán Qīng Zhēn Sì
Macau Mosque		Our Lady of Fatima Parish	Macau	1980s	
Hangzhou New Grand Mosque		Hangzhou	Zhejiang	2016	
Jiezi mosque		Xunhua Salar	Qinghai	?	?
List of mosques in Hong Kong			Hong Kong		

== See also ==
- Islam in China
- Women's mosque
- Lists of mosques
  - List of mosques in Hong Kong
  - List of mosques in Taiwan
