= M. Hasna Maznavi =

American writer, filmmaker and activist (1985–2025)

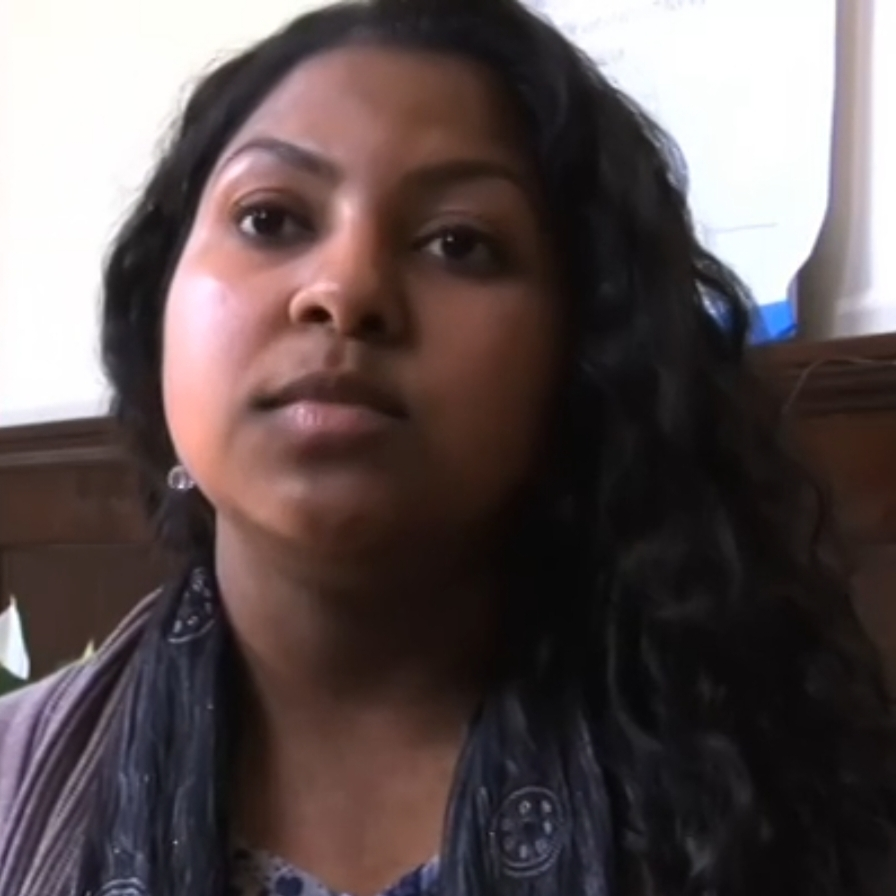
- Maznavi in 2015
- Born: October 2, 1985; Long Beach, California, U.S.
- Died: April 2, 2025 (aged 39)
- Education: University of California, Berkeley (B.A.); University of Southern California (M.F.A.)
- Occupations: Writer; filmmaker; activist
- Known for: Involvement in the Women's Mosque of America

M. Hasna Maznavi (October 2, 1985 – April 2, 2025) was an American writer, filmmaker and activist. She founded the Women's Mosque of America (the first female-led Muslim house of worship in the United States) in 2014. Maznavi was a member of the WGA, and she committed herself to changing the way Islam and Muslims are represented in mainstream American media.

== Background ==
Maznavi was born on October 2, 1985, in Long Beach, California. She was the president of the Women's Mosque of America.

She was a filmmaker and comedy writer, having received an MFA in Film and TV Production from University of Southern California's School of Cinematic Arts and her BAs in Art and Mass Communications from University of California, Berkeley.

Maznavi died of complications from diabetes on April 2, 2025, at the age of 39.

== Women's Mosque of America ==
Maznavi founded the Women's Mosque of America on August 23, 2014, at the age of 28. The Women's Mosque of America had precedents in other countries in Muslim-majority nations and elsewhere, but this was the first such space in the United States. Muslim women meet at the mosque monthly on Fridays to pray. It has other programming during the week. The mosque is led by women and housed in rented interfaith spaces in downtown Los Angeles.
