= Hangzhou Mosque =

Mosque in Hangzhou, Zhejiang, China

- 杭州清真寺
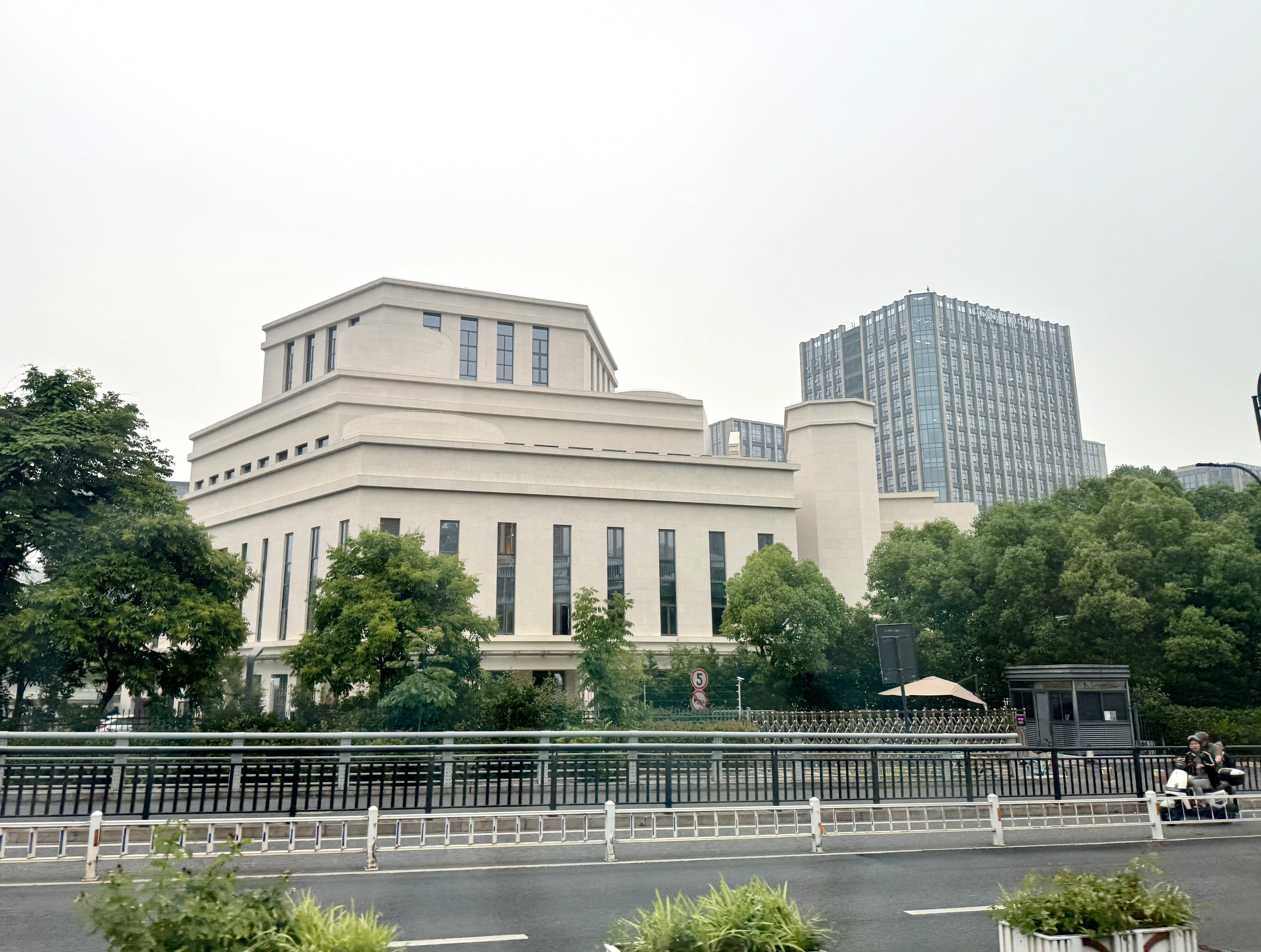

- Location of the mosque in Zhejiang

Religion
- Affiliation: Sunni Islam
- Ecclesiastical or organisational status: Mosque
- Ownership: Hangzhou Islamic Society
- Status: Active

Location
- Location: Hangzhou, Zhejiang
- Country: China
- Interactive map of Hangzhou Mosque
- Coordinates: 30°16′39″N 120°13′4″E

Architecture
- Type: Mosque
- Style: Islamic
- Groundbreaking: 12 October 2012
- Completed: 2016

Specifications
- Dome: 5 (maybe more)
- Minaret: 2

Chinese name
- Simplified Chinese: 杭州清真寺
Transcriptions
Standard Mandarin
- Hanyu Pinyin: Hángzhōu Qīngzhēnsì

The Hangzhou Mosque (Chinese: 杭州清真寺; pinyin: Hángzhōu Qīngzhēnsì) is a mosque located in Hangzhou, in the Zhejiang province of China. The Hangzhou Mosque is one of the largest mosques in China and is administered by the Hangzhou Islamic Society.

== History ==
There was only the Phoenix Mosque in Hangzhou, and in recent years the Muslim population in Hangzhou increased, so the need for a new mosque became urgent. The mosque was built during Yuan Dynasty. The prayer hall consists of three square spaces, each is covered with a brick dome in an Islamic style.

The Hangzhou Mosque was included in the list of major construction projects and in 2011, and in the following year it was approved by the Hangzhou Development and Reform Commission, and the foundation-laying ceremony was held on 12 October 2012. The mosque was completed in the Islamic style in 2016 and was officially opened in May 2017.

== Transportation ==
The mosque is accessible within walking distance south of Hangzhou East railway station.

== See also ==
- Islam in China
- List of mosques in China
