= Phoenix Mosque =

Mosque in Hangzhou, Zhejiang, China

- 凤凰寺
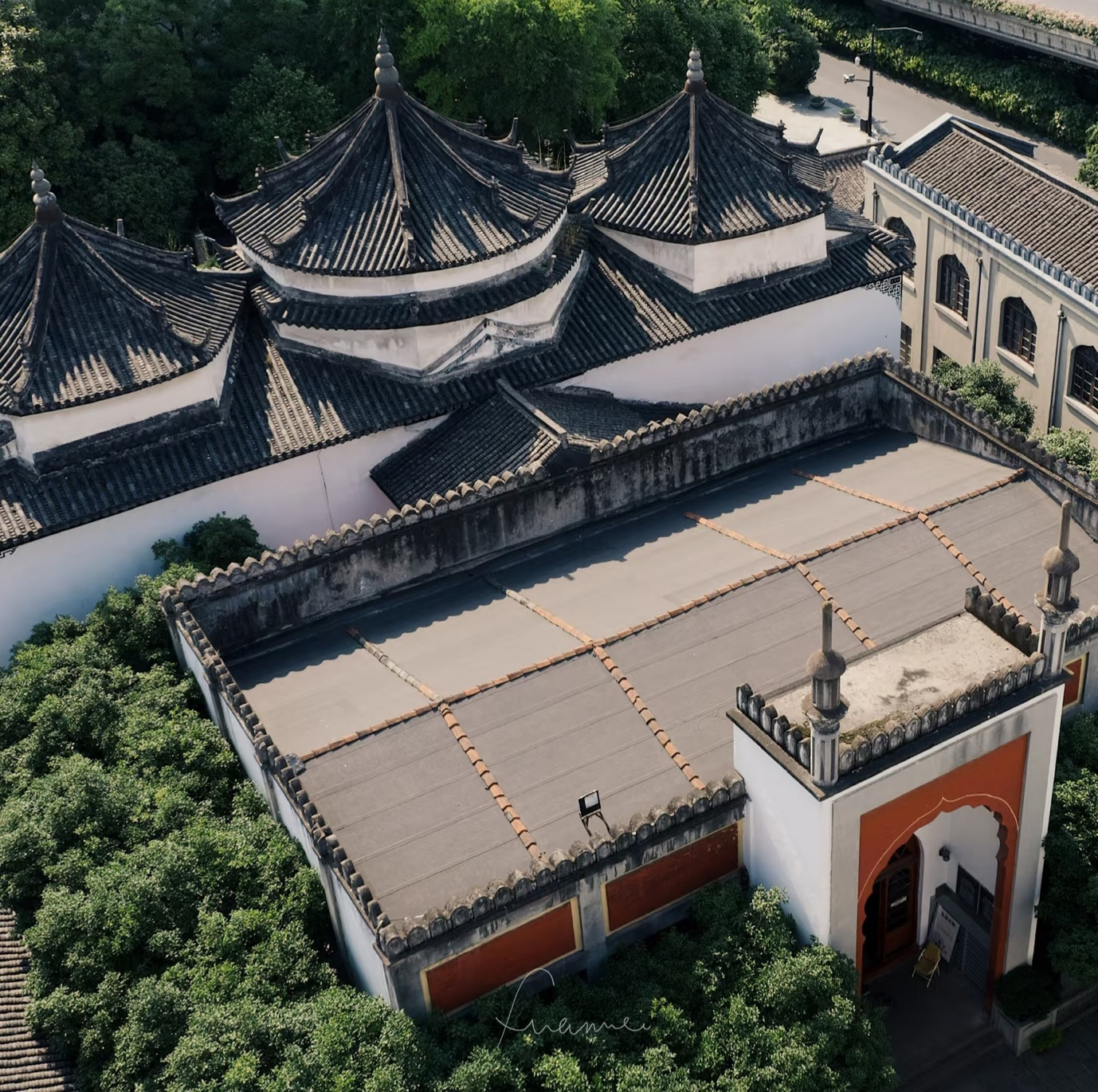

- Location of the mosque in Zhejiang

Religion
- Affiliation: Sunni Islam
- Ecclesiastical or organizational status: Mosque
- Status: Active

Location
- Location: Hangzhou, Zhejiang
- Country: China
- Interactive map of Phoenix Mosque
- Coordinates: 30°14′52″N 120°9′56″E

Architecture
- Type: Mosque
- Style: Chinese; Islamic
- Completed: c. 13th century (original); 1451 (restoration); 1743 (renovations); 1928 (minarets removed); 1953 (iwan constructed)

Specifications
- Dome: 3
- Minaret: 1 (removed in 1928)
- Materials: Bricks; redwood

Major cultural heritage sites under national-level protection
- Official name: Phoenix Mosque 凤凰寺
- Type: Cultural
- Criteria: Religion
- Reference no.: 5-298

Chinese name
- Simplified Chinese: 凤凰寺
- Traditional Chinese: 鳳凰寺
Transcriptions
Standard Mandarin
- Hanyu Pinyin: Fènghuáng Sì

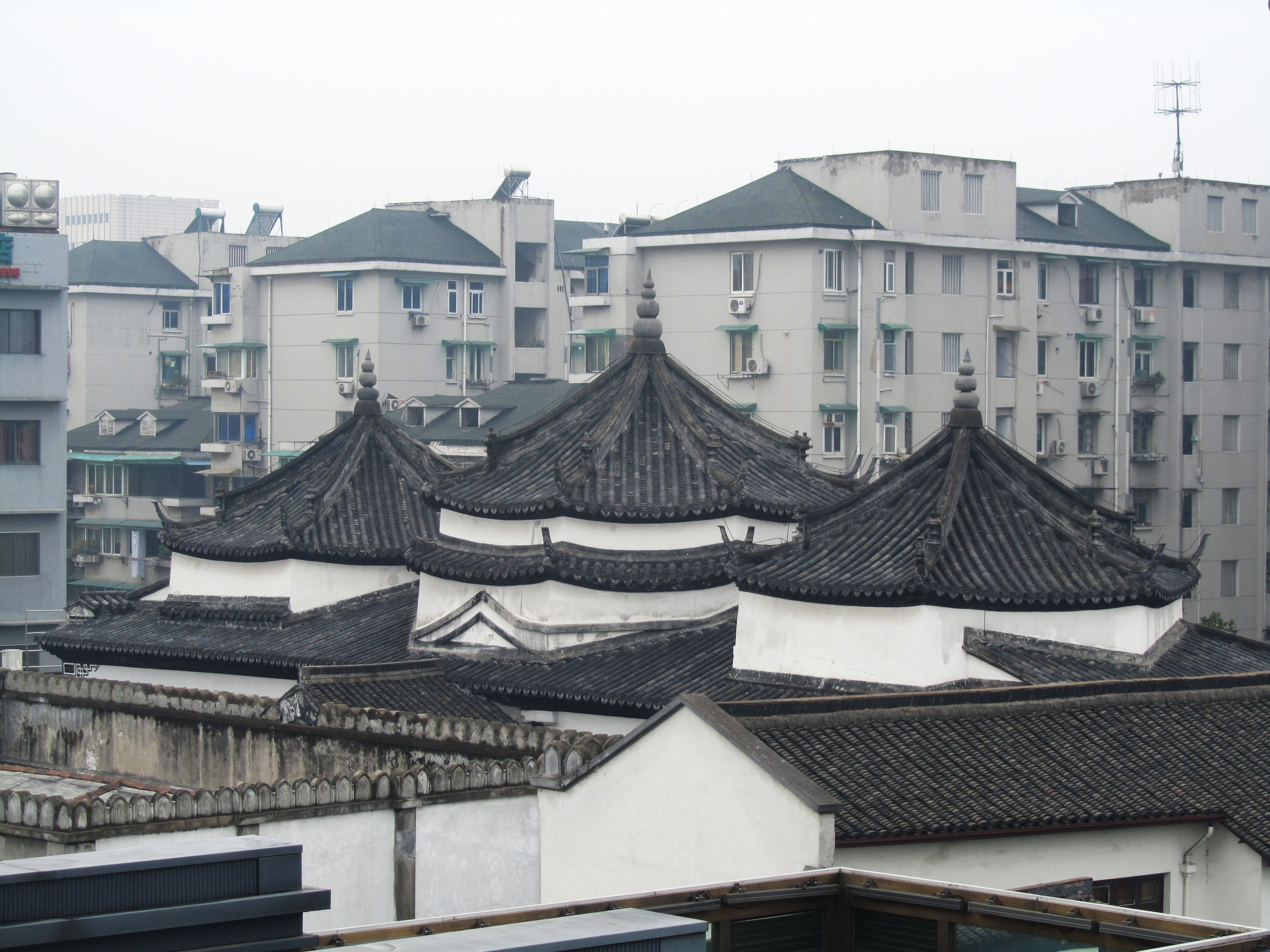
Three-domed structure of the mosque

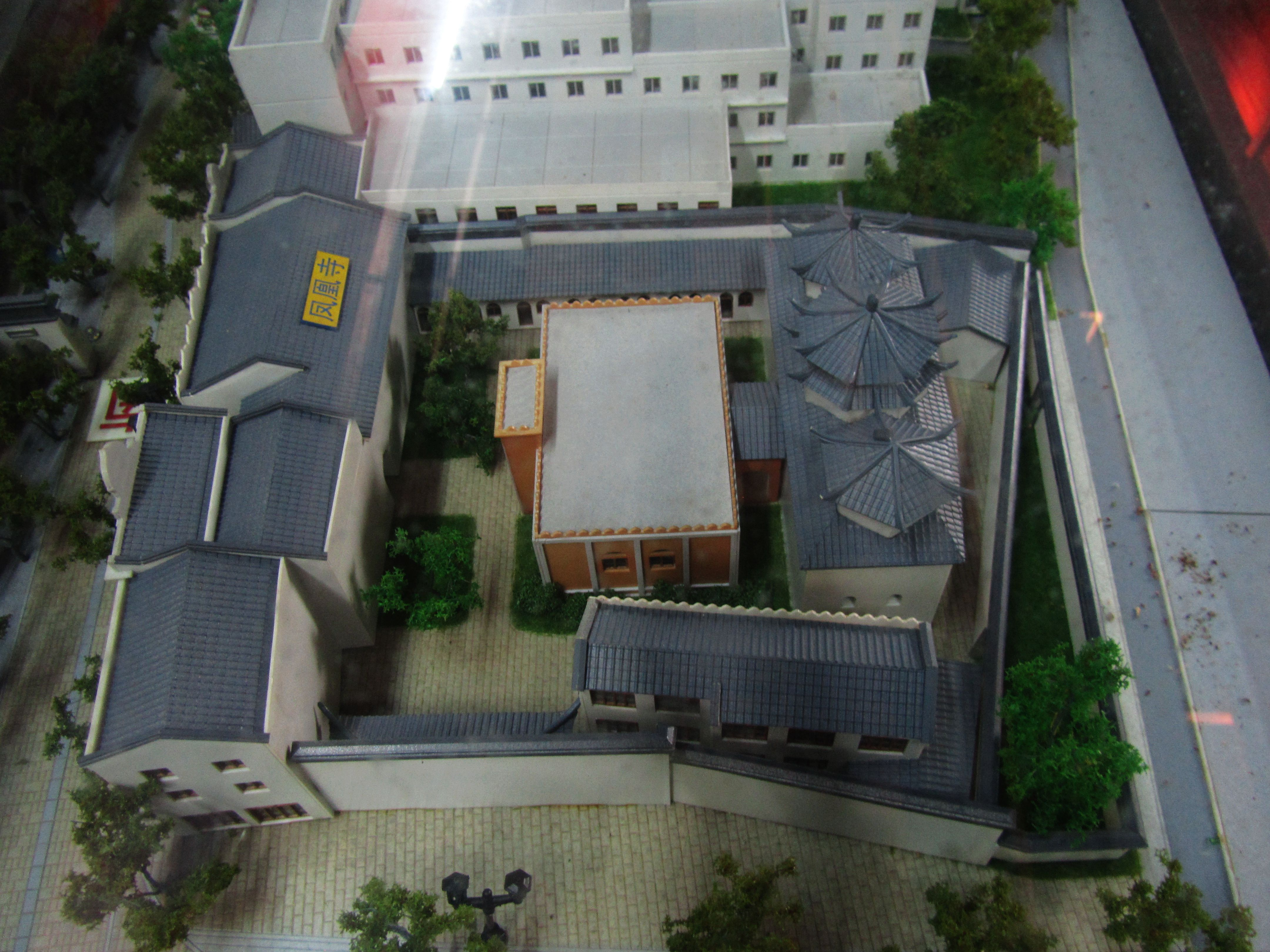
A model showing the floor plan of the mosque

The Phoenix Mosque (simplified Chinese: 凤凰寺; traditional Chinese: 鳳凰寺; pinyin: Fènghuáng Sì) is a mosque in Hangzhou, in the Zhejiang province of China. It is known for being one of the four great mosques of China. It is also one of the earliest mosque built in China. The origin of the mosque dates from the Tang or Song dynasty.

The Phoenix Mosque had been rebuilt several times. It was first destroyed around the end of Song dynasty. During the following Yuan dynasty, in 1281, the mosque was repaired under the financial assistance of Ala al-Din, a Persian settler in China. The minaret of the mosque was removed in 1928 due to the construction of adjacent roads. In 1953, the mosque underwent a complete maintenance and repair project.

The structure of the main building was heavily influenced by traditional Chinese architecture while also retaining features of Islamic architecture. The existing prayer hall was built in 1281 CE during the rule of Kublai Khan.

== Muslim community in Hangzhou ==
China's southeast coastal region was an important site for exchange between Chinese and Arabic communities through the maritime Silk Road. Particularly, this provided an opportunity for Muslim communities to be established in port cities like Hangzhou. This cultural exchange was heightened when Hangzhou became the capital of the Song dynasty during its last century. During the Song dynasty, a majority of the Muslim immigrants in Hangzhou came from an Arabic-Islamic cultural background due to the trade relations between the Arab world and Song government. Despite the steady growth of the Muslim community in the region, their influence on local society was still minimal.

After the fall of the Song dynasty, the new Mongol rulers of the Yuan dynasty continually welcomed Muslim traders and people into the region. During this period, Hangzhou became a flourishing cosmopolitan city with an influential and active Muslim community. Muslims in Hangzhou had their own settlements, burial grounds, and a few Friday mosques. Travelers like Marco Polo and Ibn Battuta, described Hangzhou as being large and vibrant. In fact, Italian missionary Odoric of Pordenone even wrote that Hangzhou was "the City of Heaven" and noted that he met some people in Venice who had also visited Hangzhou. While a large portion of the Muslim community in Hangzhou were Arab and Persian Muslims, there were also diasporic Muslims from Annam, India, and Korea. Additionally, there were also some Muslim immigrants from other regions in China as well. Later in the Ming dynasty, there was yet another influx of Chinese Muslims to Hangzhou as the region became a hotbed of the silk industry. Indeed, the Muslim community was so well-rooted that during the Qianlong period in the Qing dynasty, the Qing emperor's consort, the Fragrant Concubine, visited the Phoenix Mosque whenever she passed through Hangzhou.

== Architecture ==
The main entrance to the Phoenix Mosque is on the east side of the complex. Due to this, once a worshipper enters the complex, they immediately face the qibla containing the mihrab. Notably, it is the oldest mosque with this arrangement. The qibla is located at the back of a central, octagonal domed space. There are two domes on either side of the central dome that are hexagonal in shape.

The interior of the central dome is decorated with painting depicting flowers, mountains, animals, and rivers. These paintings are contained with a symmetrical floral motif. These well-preserved decorations date back to the Ming dynasty. The two surrounding domes have a similar design as well. The zone of transition between the dome and the prayer hall is decorated with honeycomb and tiered plaster surfaces. The prayer hall is made of brick and is the oldest remaining part of the building. The prayer hall is reminiscent of the brick corbels, a structural motif common in Islamic mosque architecture. The mosque also features corner bracketing and three domes, characteristic of Chinese temples.

The mosque features an I-shaped floor plan, which is named the gong-plan for the Chinese character "工." This configuration is characterized by two large halls joined by narrow arcade. In Chinese architecture, this plan is usually reserved for important buildings. For instance, some of the halls in the Forbidden City in Beijing have this plan as well. Additionally, the floor plan of the mosque is said to also resembles its namesake "phoenix," as the main worship hall spreads out beyond the center of the mosque like the wings of a phoenix. The first written association of the mosque with the phoenix is found on a 15th-century stele written by Liu Zhiping, but it is possible that the name predates the inscription.

=== The steles and tombstones ===
Much of the historical record of the mosque is recorded on a collection of steles that are now housed within the mosque complex. They corroborate information about the historical location of the mosque and also describe other nearby centers of worship such as a Uighur mosque and a Nestorian church. These steles also show that the mosque has had many historical names before its current name. Some historical names include the Temple of Ritual Salutations, Wu-lin Gardens, and Li Bai Temple. Other steles in the mosque complex corroborate evidence that the mosque was built in the Tang dynasty but destroyed by fire at the end of the Song.

In addition to the steles, the mosque currently houses twenty-one Yuan dynasty tombstones which were retrieved from a Muslim cemetery. These tombstones are written in stylized Arabic and Persian and detail the deaths of some military and religious figures, as well as merchants. Some of the tombstones include dates given in not only the Islamic calendar, but the Turkish animal calendar and Chinese calendar as well. This shows the multicultural and cosmopolitan characteristic of Mongol rule in the area. The style of the inscriptions also shows the rich Muslim community of the area during this period in time. Three of the elegies on the tombstones were composed specifically for the memorialized person. Hangzhou not only hosted skilled engravers to inscribe the works, but also poets to write compositions for these steles.

== Current Mosque ==
Today's Phoenix Mosque is around half the size that it was in the Song or Yuan dynasty. While it used to be one of the six mosques servicing the Muslim community in Hangzhou, at one stage it was the only remaining mosque. Since 2016, Friday prayers and festivals are not prayed at the mosque, and the prayer moved to the Hangzhou Mosque during 2016 and 2017.

The Phoenix Mosque has been destroyed, renovated, and repaired several times. Its current form is an amalgamation of changes made during the following periods of reconstruction.

=== 1451 renovation ===
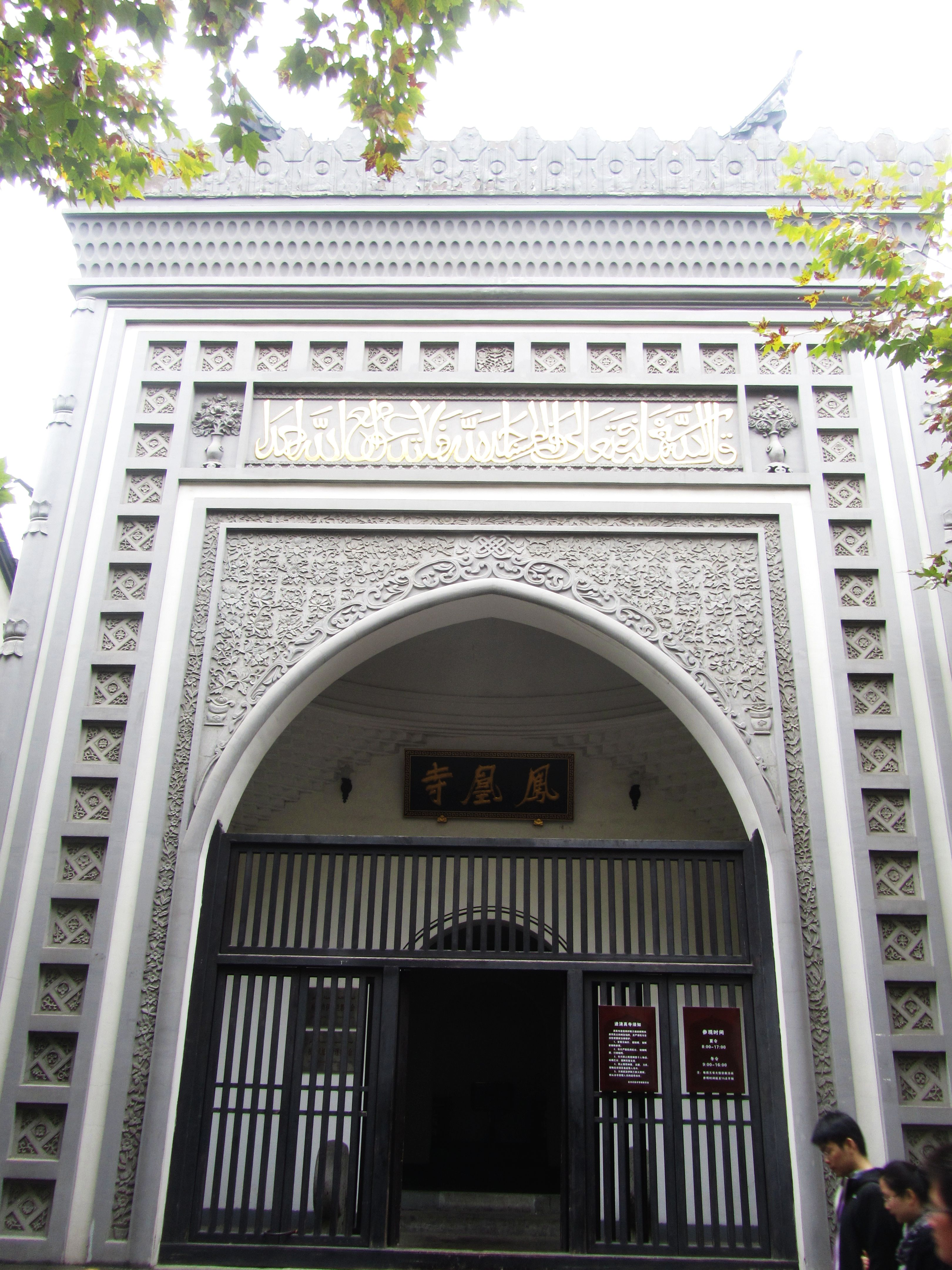
The main iwan of the mosque

Notably, this restoration contributed the current mihrab of the mosque. It is made from gilded red wood and has inscribed verses from the Qur'an.

=== 1743 renovation ===
This restoration was presided over by a local Muslim scholar called Scholar Ding. An inscription detailing this project lists 233 donors, including from many regions outside of Hangzhou. The longest distance donation is one from Cangzhou, which today is in the Hui Autonomous Region near Beijing. This record shows that long distance donors and diasporic donor networks contributed to the survival of large mosques like the Phoenix Mosque in regions where the Muslim population was the minority.

The opening lines of the inscription detailing this renovation evokes an edict passed by the first Ming emperor, Hongwu Emperor. In this edict, the Emperor commissions two mosques in Xi'an and Nanjing. At the time, the 1743 inscription was written, it had been nearly 400 years since the issuing of the Emperor's edict. Unlike Buddhism and Daoism, Islam was less institutionalized by the imperial government. This inscription shows that aspiration of the Muslim community to be institutionally recognized in the same way as other faiths.

=== Other renovations ===
The mosque used to have a minaret that was destroyed in 1929 and replaced by a gate. The current gate with two minaret-like towers was constructed in 1953.

== See also ==
- Islam in China
- List of mosques in China
- List of Major National Historical and Cultural Sites in Zhejiang
