= Jinan Great Southern Mosque =

Mosque in Jinan, Shandong, China

- 济南清真南大寺
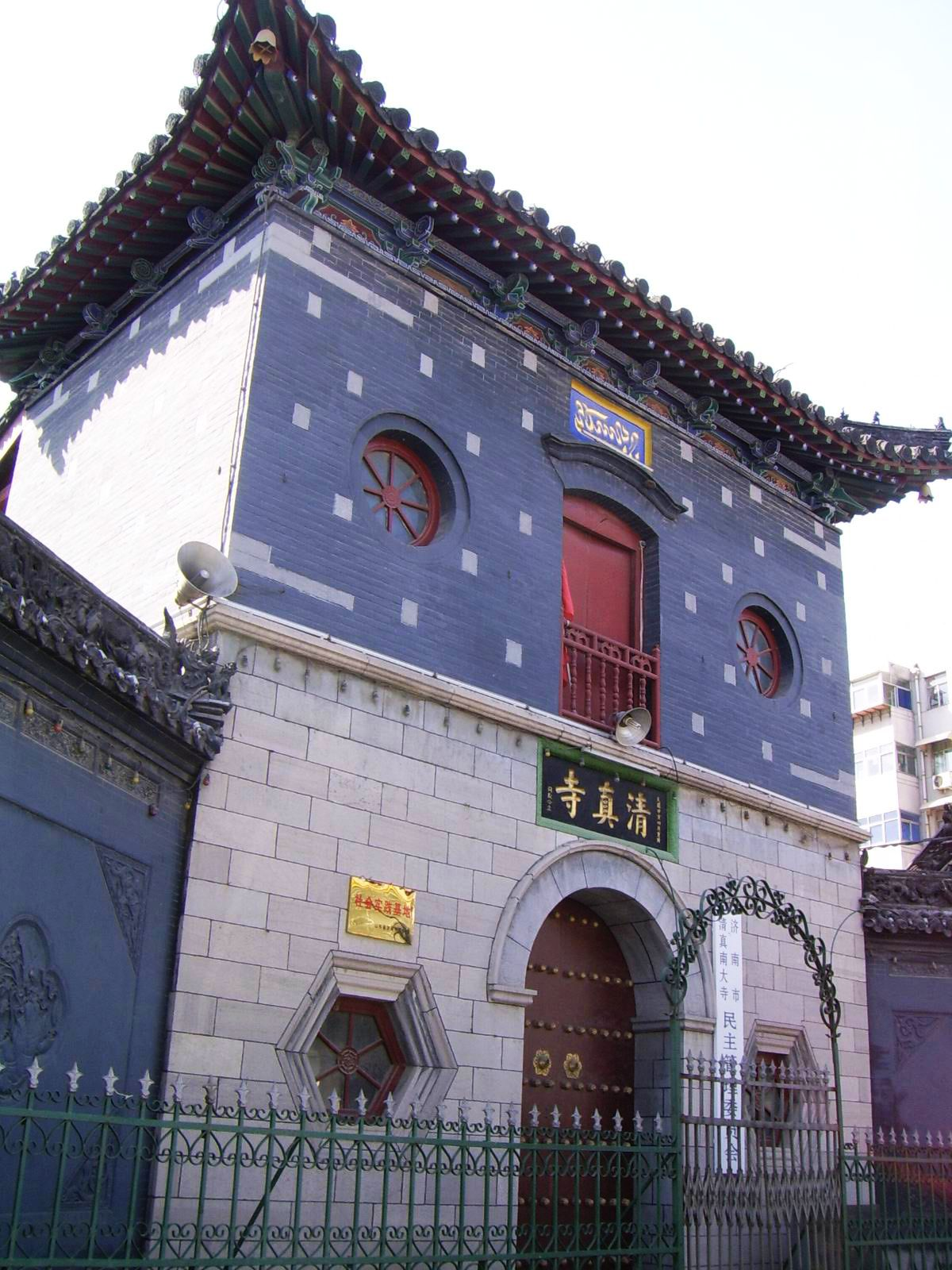

- Location of the mosque in Shandong

Religion
- Affiliation: Sunni Islam
- Ecclesiastical or organizational status: Mosque
- Status: Active

Location
- Location: Jinan, Shandong
- Country: China
- Interactive map of Jinan Great Southern Mosque
- Coordinates: 36°39′31″N 117°0′13″E

Architecture
- Type: Mosque
- Style: Chinese
- Completed: 1295 CE (original); 1436 and 1492 CE (expansion)

Specifications
- Interior area: 2,830 m^{2} (30,500 sq ft)
- Site area: 6,630 m^{2} (71,400 sq ft)

Chinese name
- Simplified Chinese: 济南清真南大寺
- Traditional Chinese: 濟南清真南大寺
Transcriptions
Standard Mandarin
- Hanyu Pinyin: Jìnán Qīngzhēn Nándàsì

The Jinan Great Southern Mosque (simplified Chinese: 济南清真南大寺; traditional Chinese: 濟南清真南大寺; pinyin: Jìnán Qīngzhēn Nándàsì) is a mosque located in Lixia District in the city of Jinan, in the Shandong province of China. It was established in 1295 CE, during the Yuan dynasty. Most of the present structures were erected between 1436 and 1492, during the Ming dynasty. The mosque form is laid out similar to a Chinese temple into which the elements needed for its function as a mosque have been integrated. The mosque is located to the west of the historical city center and the Baotu Spring Park. Its location is at the southern entrance to Jinan's Muslim quarter (Huimin Xiaoqu).

== History ==
According to legend, the Great Southern Mosque was founded during the Tang dynasty, but there are no known records to confirm this. The written record dates the establishment of the mosque at its present site to 1295 CE, during the first year of the reign of Temür Khan (Emperor Chengzong of Yuan).

Construction of the present day structures started in the 1420s and 1430s. Significant expansions were completed in 1492 CE, the fifth year in the reign of the Hongzhi Emperor. Other recorded renovations followed during the reigns of the Jiajing (r. 1521–1567) and Wanli (r. 1572–1620) Emperors of the Ming dynasty, the Jiaqing (r. 1796–1820), Daoguang (r. 1820–1850), and Tongzhi (r. 1861–1875) Emperors of the Qing dynasty, as well as during the early Republican era.

The mosque was damaged severely during the Cultural Revolution with many of the historical artifacts it housed being destroyed and the building converted into a factory. Since 1992, it has been protected as a provincial-level key cultural heritage site.

== Architecture ==
The basic layout of the mosque follows the courtyard style of a traditional Chinese temple with major buildings arranged along a main axis of symmetry. However, whereas in a Chinese temple, this main axis is typically oriented in the north-south direction, the main axis of the Great Southern Mosque is oriented in the east-west direction so that upon entering the main prayer hall one faces west (towards Mecca).

In keeping with Chinese tradition, the main entrance of the mosque is protected by a spirit wall. In total, the mosque site covers 6,630 square metres (71,400 sq ft) of which 2,830 square metres (30,500 sq ft) are covered by buildings.

== Gallery ==
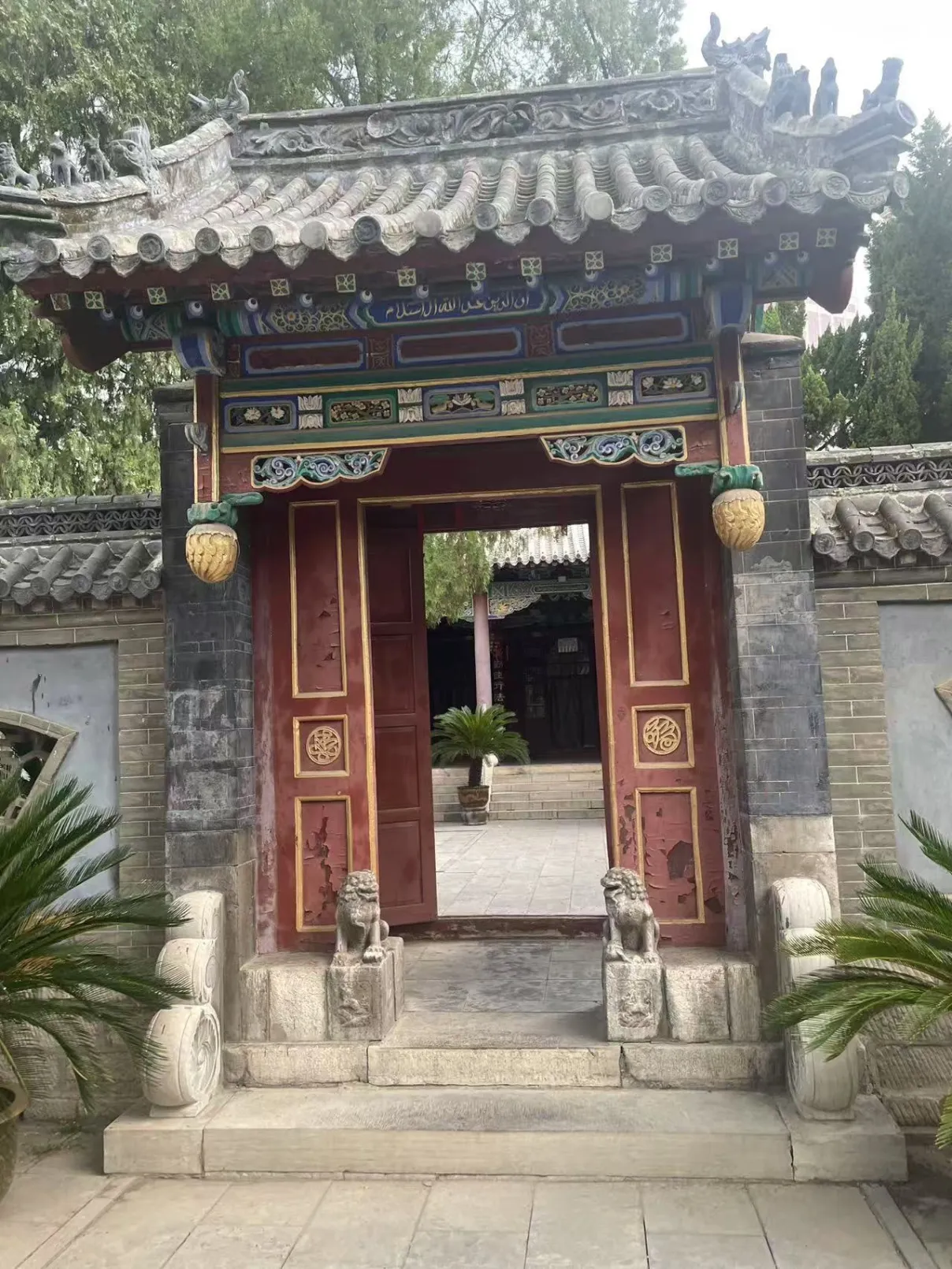
Sahn entrance

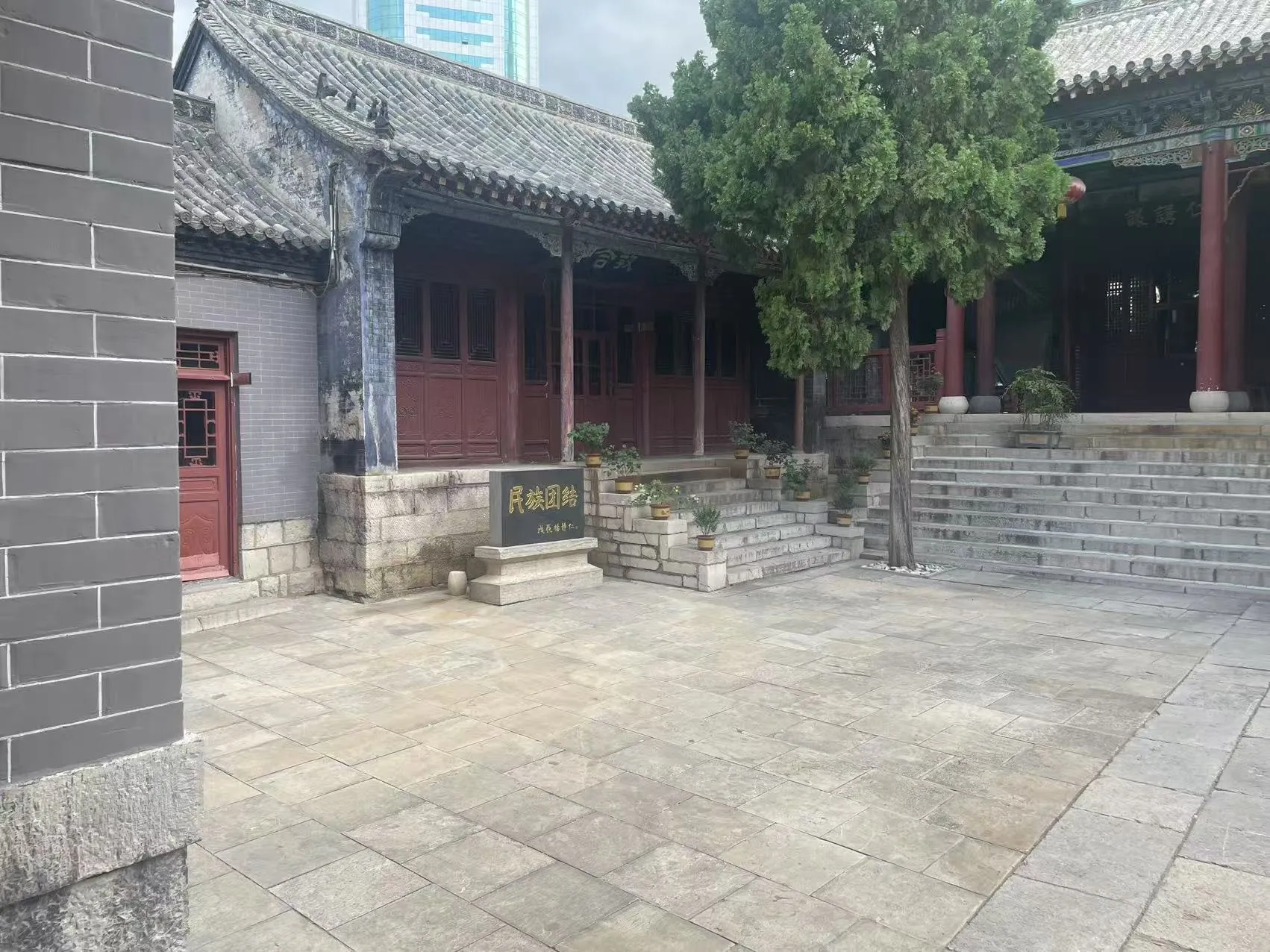
Sahn

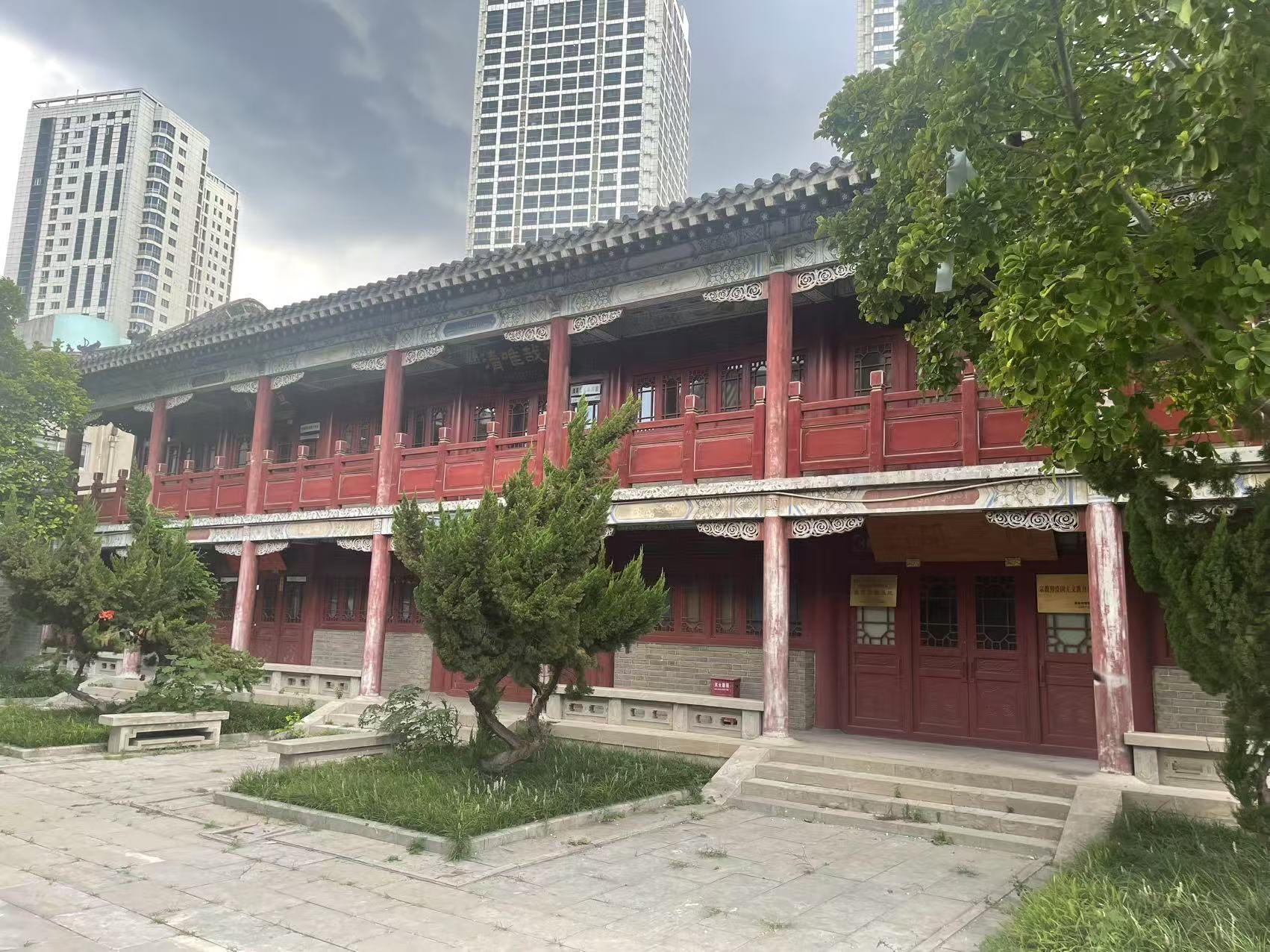
Exterior

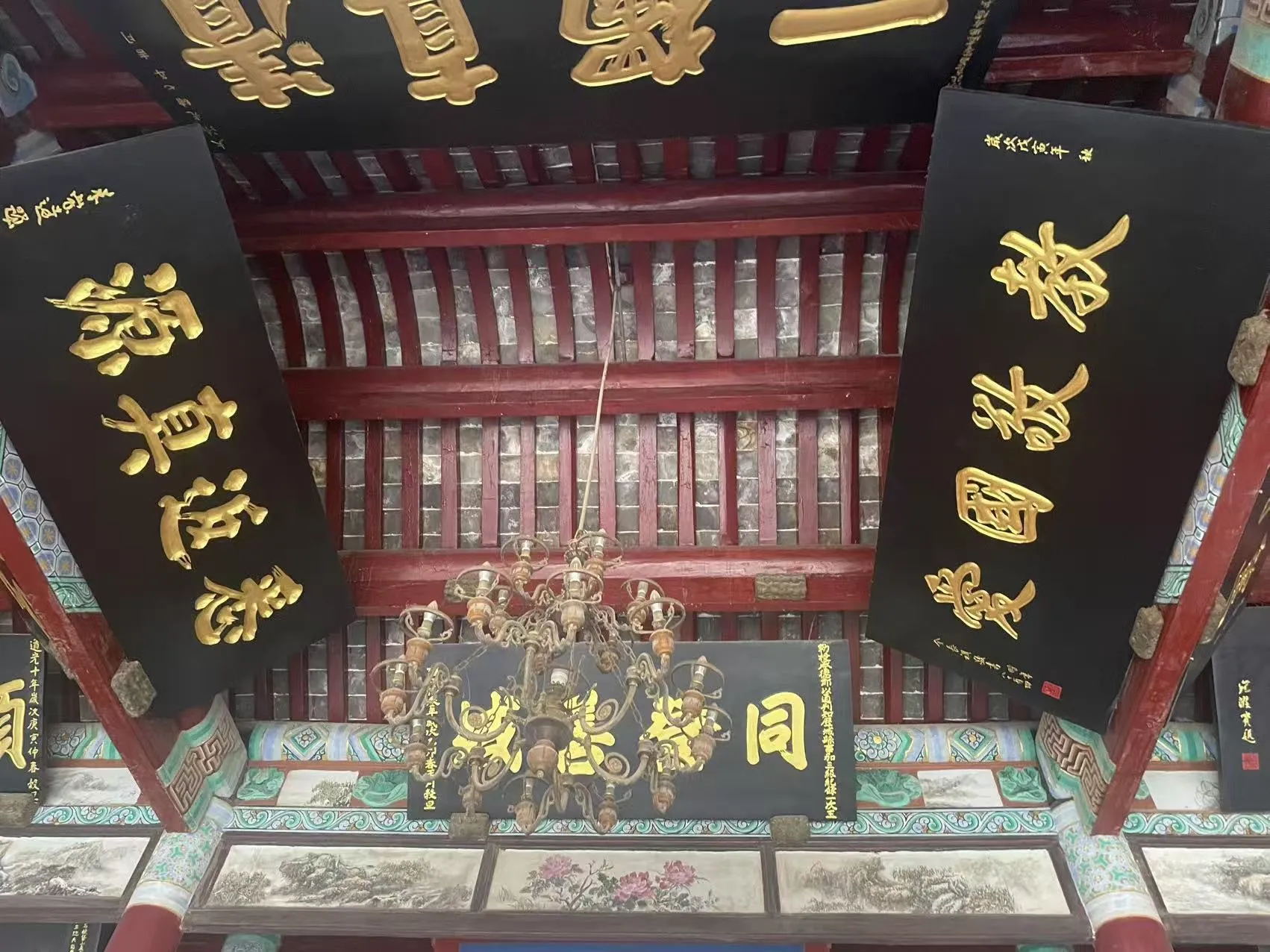
Hall entrance

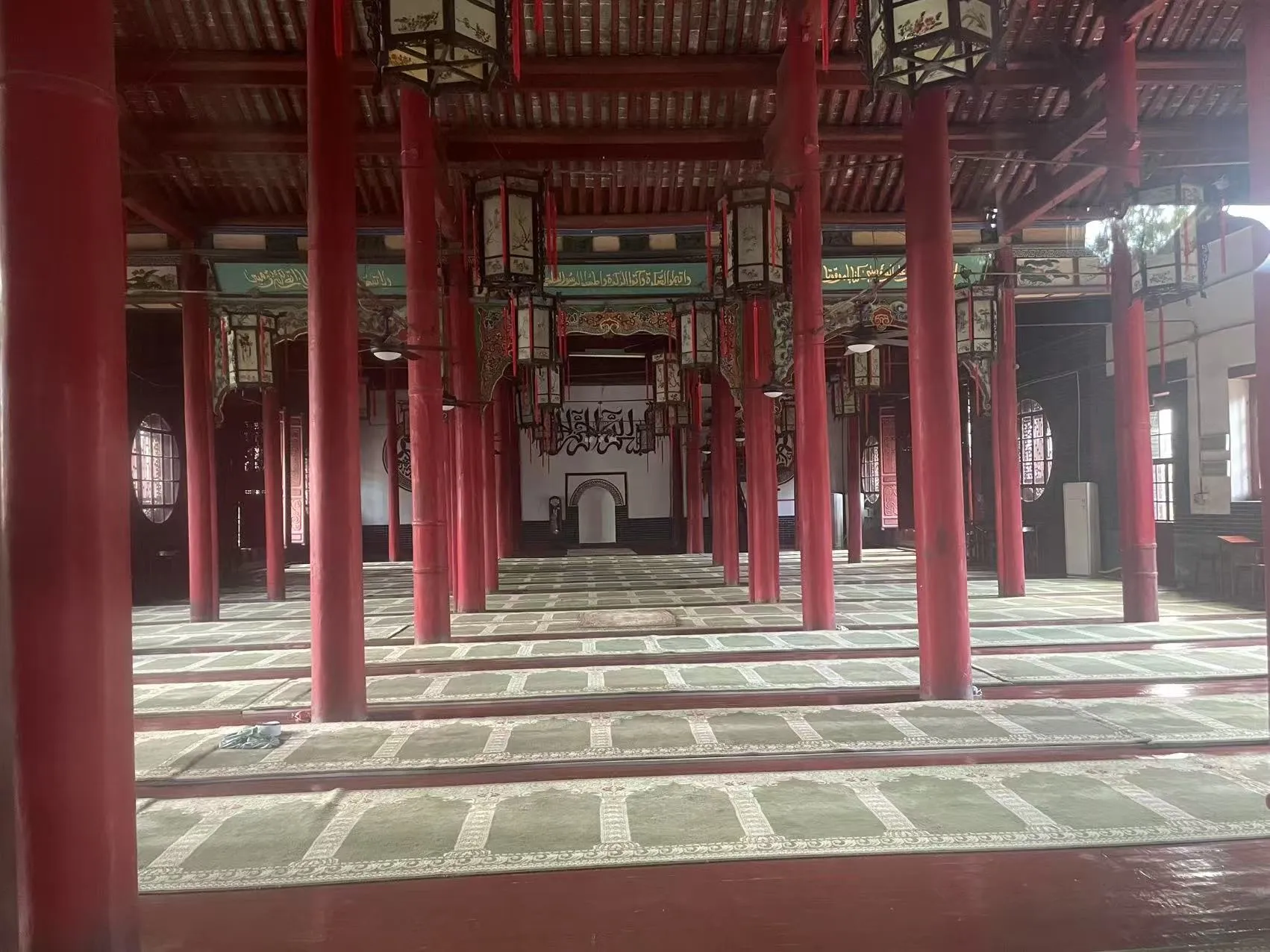
Prayer hall

== See also ==
- Islam in China
- List of mosques in China
- List of sites in Jinan
