= Xiaotaoyuan Mosque =

Mosque in Huangpu, Shanghai, China

- 小桃园清真寺
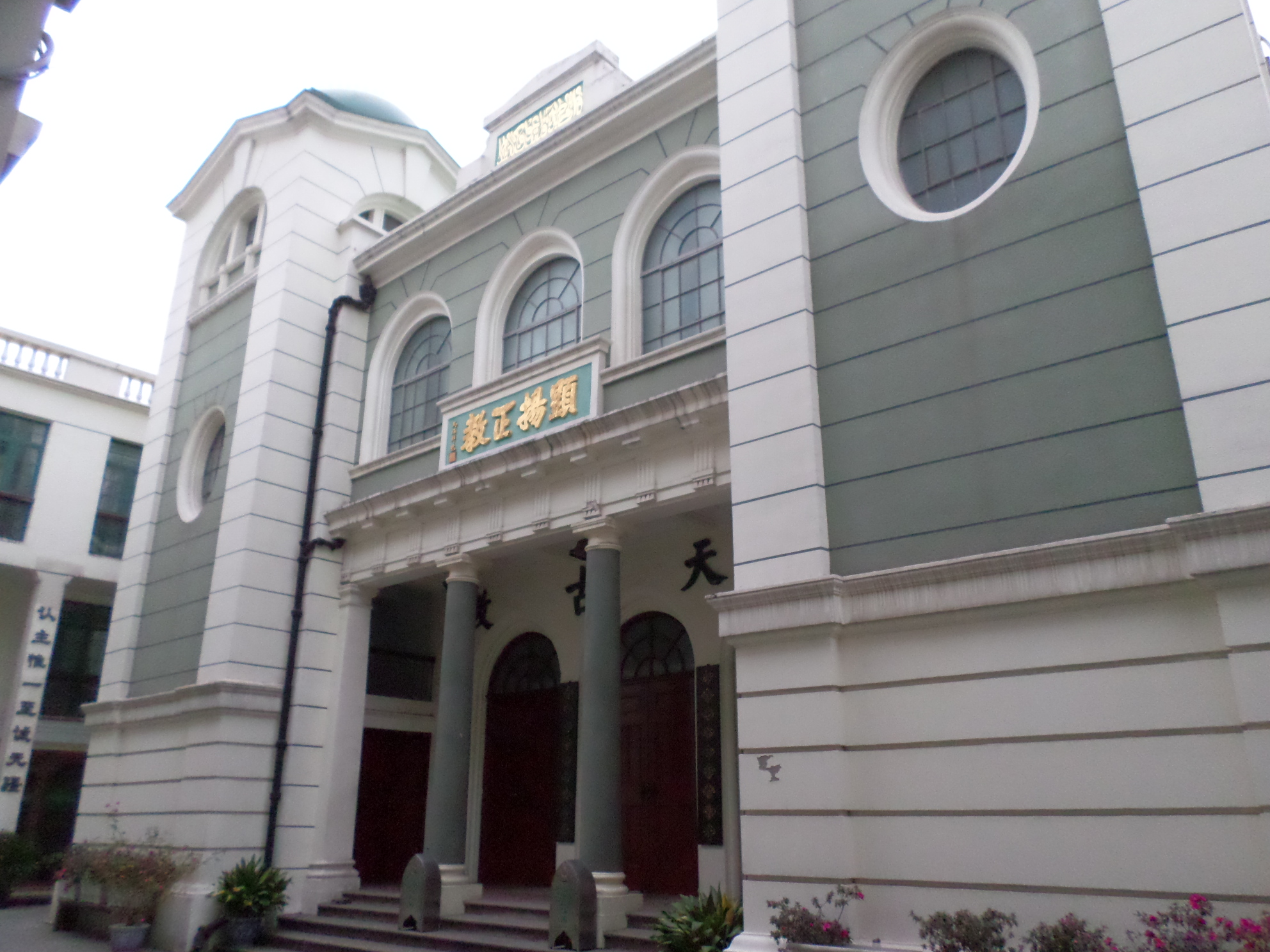

- Location of the mosque in Shanghai

Religion
- Affiliation: Islam
- Branch/tradition: Sunni
- Ecclesiastical or organizational status: Mosque
- Status: Active

Location
- Location: 52 Xiaotaoyuan Street, Huangpu, Shanghai
- Country: China
- Interactive map of Xiaotaoyuan Mosque
- Coordinates: 31°13′N 121°29′E

Architecture
- Type: Mosque
- Style: West Asian Islamic; Chinese
- Completed: 1917 (original building); 1927 (current building)

Specifications
- Capacity: 500 worshipers
- Interior area: 500 m^{2} (5,400 sq ft)
- Dome: 4
- Minaret: 1

The Xiaotaoyuan Mosque (simplified Chinese: 小桃园清真寺; traditional Chinese: 小桃園清真寺; pinyin: Xiǎotáoyuán Qīngzhēnsì), formerly known as the Islamic Western Mosque or the Shanghai Western Mosque, is a mosque in Huangpu District, Shanghai, China. It is the largest mosque in Shanghai.

== History ==
The Xiaotaoyuan Mosque was built in 1917 by Jin Ziyun, the Director of the Shanghai Islamic Board of Directors, who had bought the land. It was then rebuilt in 1925 and completed two years later in the shape it is today. The site of the mosque was the original site for the Shanghai Islamic Normal School which was later moved to Qinglian Street and renamed Pingliang Islamic Normal School. Other schools established by the mosques were the Islam Normal School, Primary School for Muslims, Mingcheng Primary School, Chongben Primary School, Shanghai Islam Orphanage etc.

After the founding of the People's Republic of China on 1 October 1949, Shanghai Mayor Chen Yi inspected the mosque and approved appropriate funds for its maintenance. On 15 February 1994, the mosque was listed as heritage architecture by the Shanghai Municipal Government.

== Architecture ==
The mosque was built in the traditional West Asian Islamic style combined with Chinese architecture. The exterior is painted green and white. Above its entrance gate contains the word 'mosque' in Chinese drawn by calligrapher Luo Junti. The main two-storey prayer hall can accommodate up to 500 people with a floor area of 500 square metres (5,400 sq ft). It is completed with arched windows. The mosque also has a minaret and four domes at the four corners of the mosque.

The mosque is surrounded by a rectangular courtyard. On the east side of the courtyard is a three-story Chinese style-building which houses lecture room, offices, library, reading room, sermon room and ablution facilities. On the south side of the courtyard is the Imam's room, reception room and bathroom. Next to the main mosque building is the Xiaotaoyuan Mosque for women located at 24 Xiaotaoyuan Street. The building was built in 1920 and renovated in 1994.

== Activities ==
In 1920–1940, the mosque received and served Muslim people from regions around China who planned to go for Hajj to Saudi Arabia. The mosque is home to the Shanghai Islamic Association which was established in 1962 and also the Management Committee of Mosques in Shanghai. The women's mosque hosts religious activities for Muslim women in Shanghai. Many Chinese and foreign Muslims have gather at the mosque to take part in prayers. Many high ranking government officials and prestigious people from Islamic countries also have visited the mosque and taken part in prayers.

== Transportation ==
The mosque is accessible within walking distance east of Laoximen Station of Shanghai Metro.

== Gallery ==
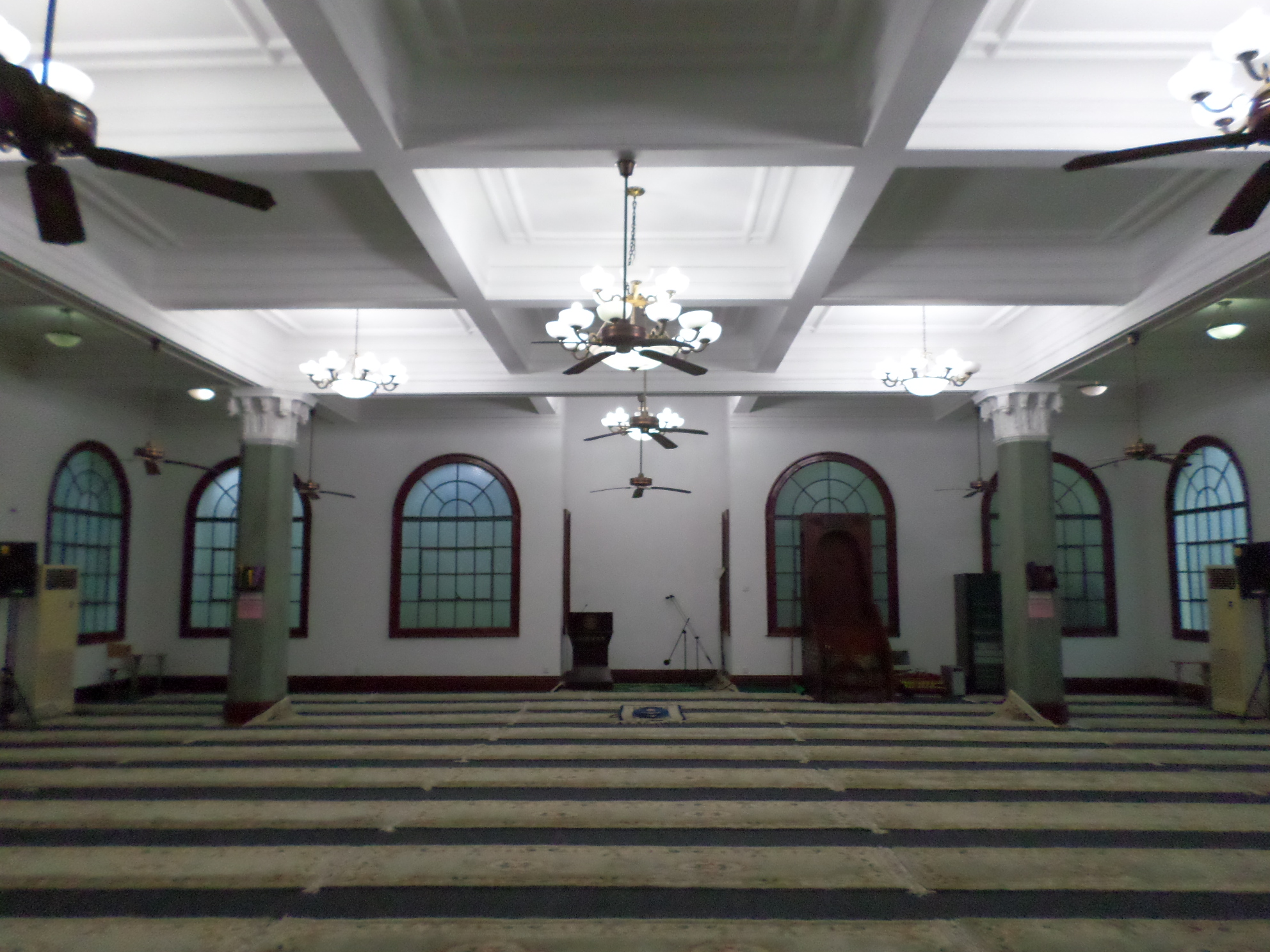
The mosque prayer hall

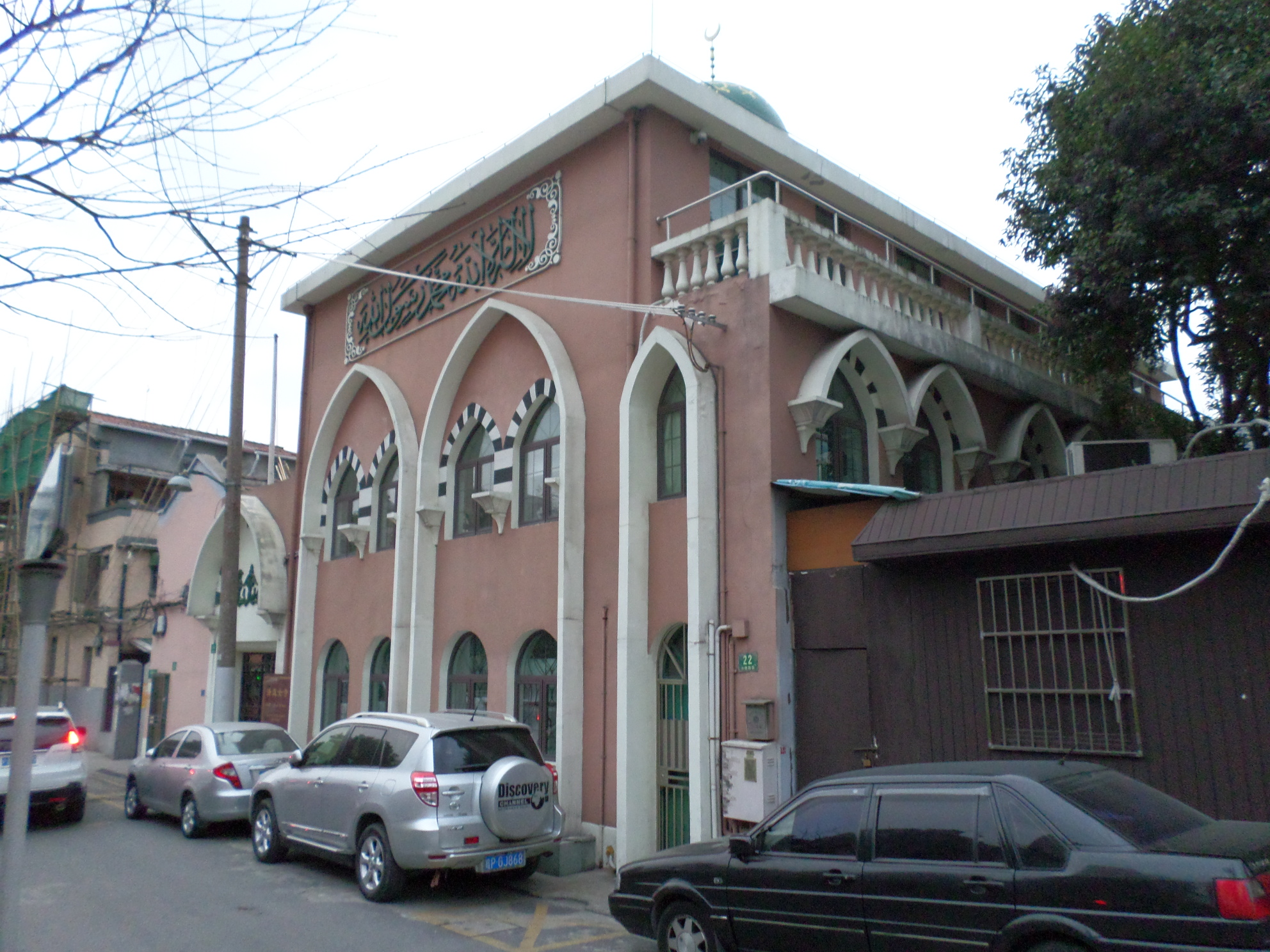
The adjacent women's mosque

== See also ==
- Islam in China
- List of mosques in China
- Women's mosques
