= Dunhuang Mosque =

Mosque in Dunhuang, Gansu, China

- 敦煌清真寺
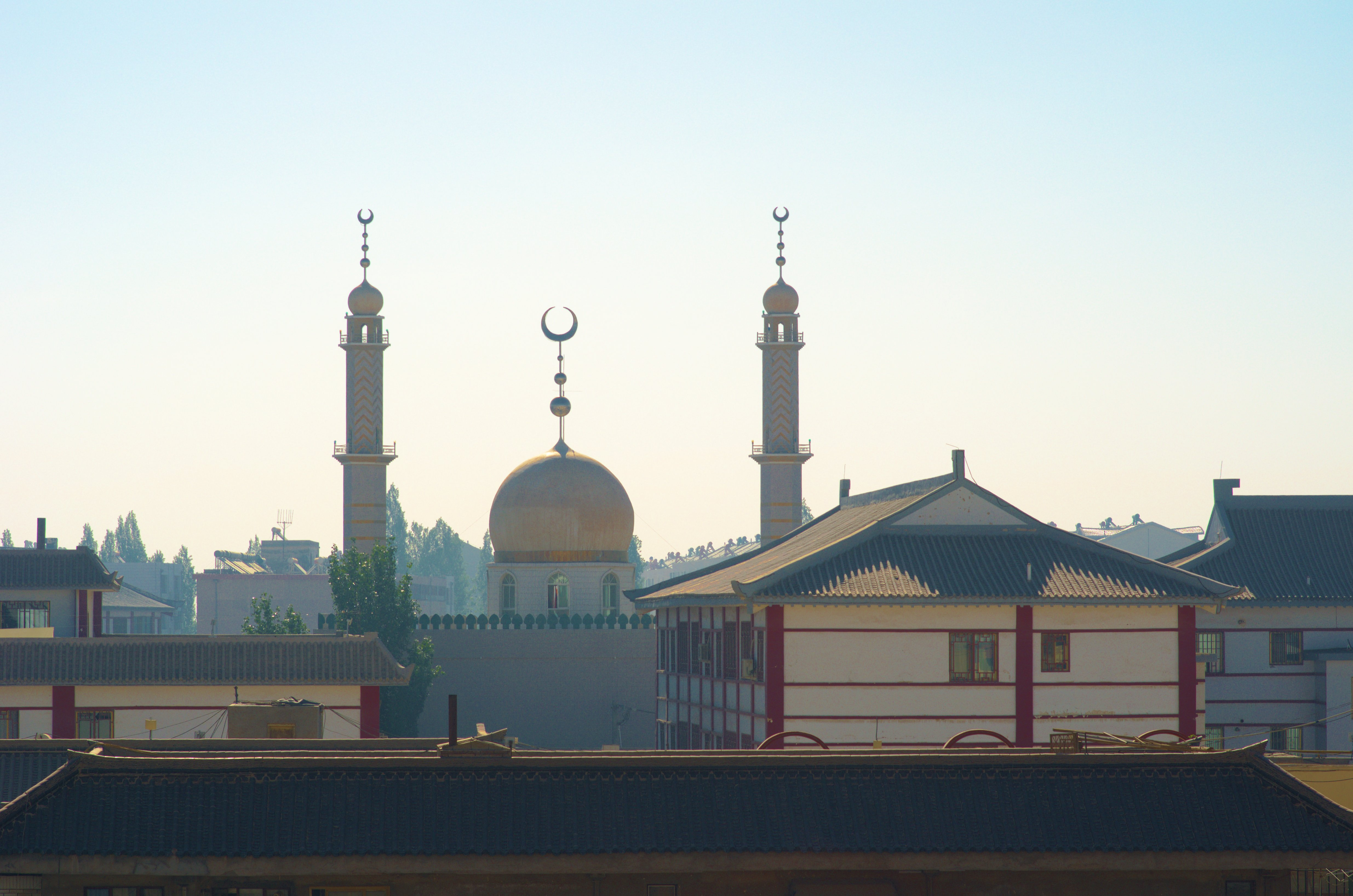

- Location of the mosque in Gansu

Religion
- Affiliation: Sunni Islam
- Ecclesiastical or organizational status: Mosque
- Status: Active

Location
- Location: Dunhuang, Gansu
- Country: China
- Interactive map of Dunhuang Mosque
- Coordinates: 40°8′20″N 94°40′5″E

Architecture
- Type: Mosque
- Completed: 1917 (rebuild)

Specifications
- Capacity: 100 worshipers
- Dome: 1
- Minaret: 2

The Dunhuang Mosque (Chinese: 敦煌清真寺; pinyin: Dūnhuáng Qīngzhēnsì) is a mosque in Dunhuang City, Gansu Province, China.

== Overview ==
The mosque was originally built in the Ming Dynasty and rebuilt in 1917.

The mosque consists of a main hall and two side halls. The main hall is located in the west and opposite to the east. The north and south sides of the hall are closed to the main hall. At the back of the main hall, there are two-story building and living room for the imams.

== See also ==
- Islam in China
- List of mosques in China
