= Fuyou Road Mosque =

Mosque in Huangpu, Shanghai, China

- 福佑路清真寺
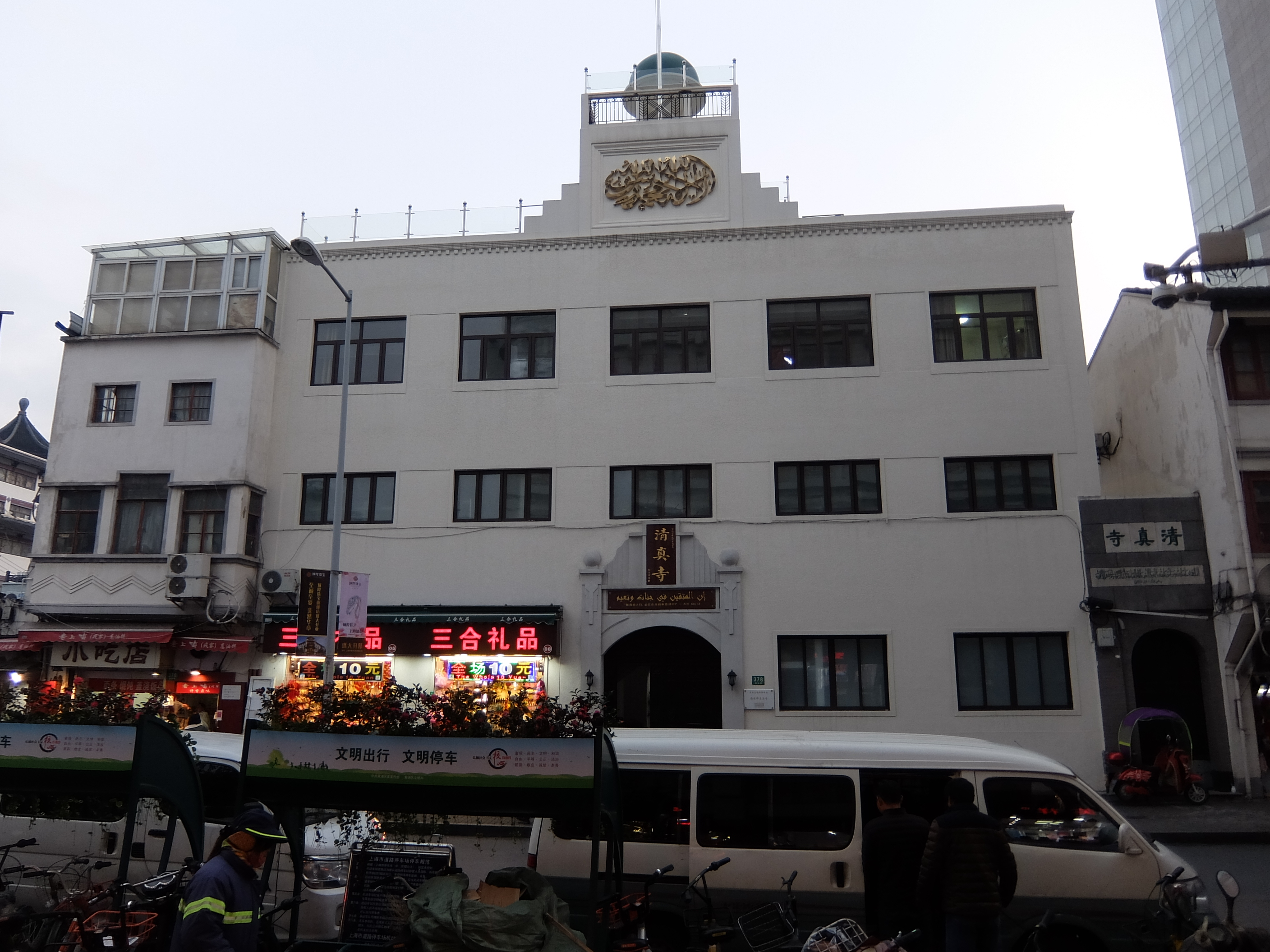

- Location of the mosque in Shanghai

Religion
- Affiliation: Islam
- Branch/tradition: Sunni
- Ecclesiastical or organizational status: mosque
- Status: Active

Location
- Location: 378 Fuyou Road, Huangpu, Shanghai
- Country: China
- Interactive map of Fuyou Road Mosque
- Coordinates: 31°14′N 121°29′E

Architecture
- Type: mosque
- Completed: 1870

Specifications
- Interior area: 1,520 m^{2} (16,400 sq ft)
- Dome: 1

The Fuyou Road Mosque (Chinese: 福佑路清真寺; pinyin: Fúyòu Lù Qīngzhēnsì), also known as the North Mosque, is a mosque in the Huangpu District of Shanghai, China.

== History ==
Prior to the construction of the mosque, Muslims from Nanjing rented two houses for prayer. In 1870, a group of 31 Muslims raised funds to purchase 400 square metres (4,300 sq ft) and constructed the Fuyou Road Mosque during the 9th year of the Tongzhi Emperor's reign of the Qing dynasty. The mosque was then later renovated and expanded several times in 1897, 1905, 1936 and 1979.

== Architecture ==
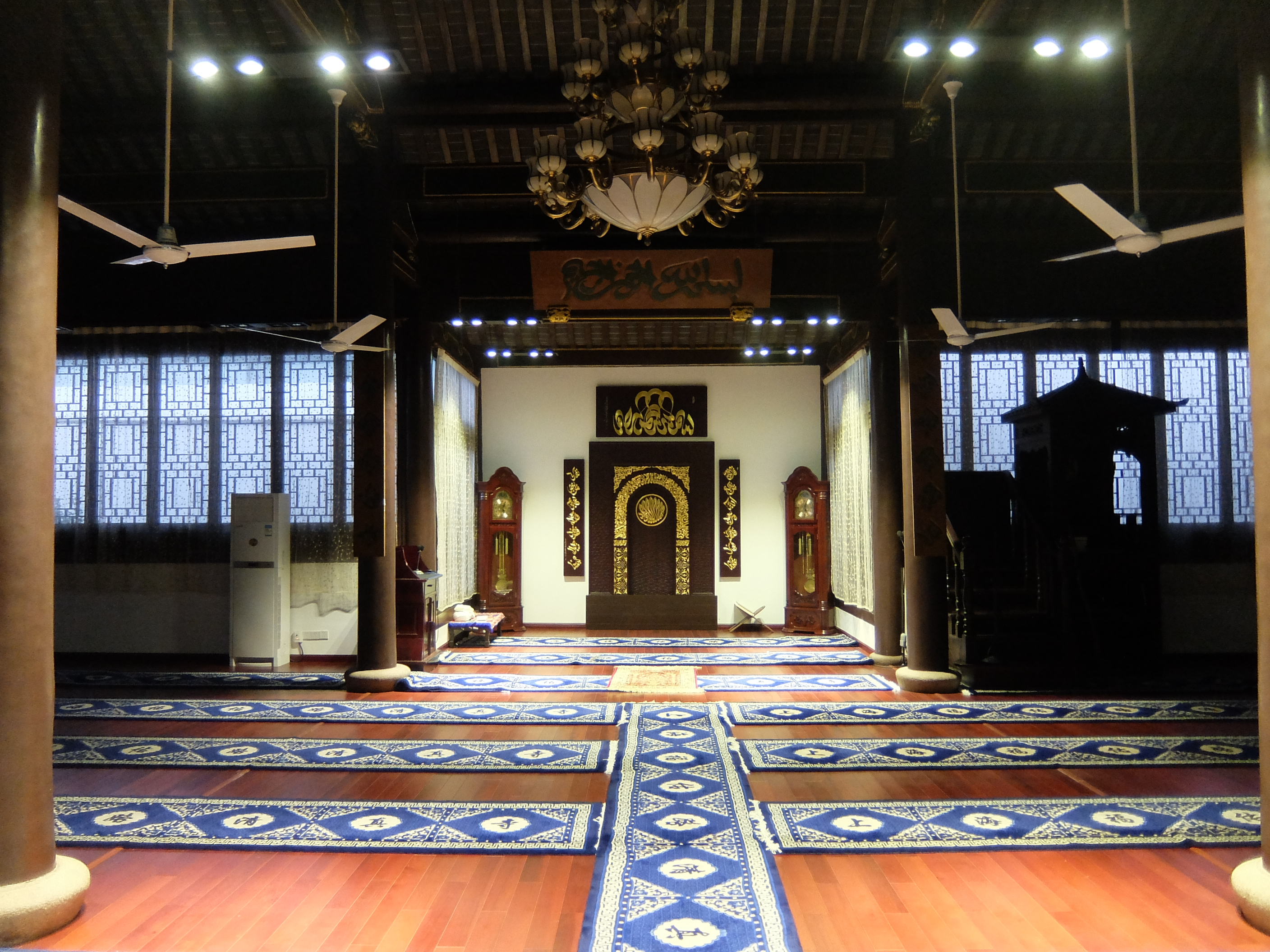
The mosque prayer hall

The mosque covers 1,520 square metres (16,400 sq ft) located in a three-story building in a traditional Qing dynasty style. The building houses the prayer hall, audience hall, dean's room, libraries, conference halls, bathrooms and other facilities. There is a rectangular-shaped sahn right after the entrance of the building. In the north of the yard stands the wudu and in the south stands the prayer hall.

The Wangyue Pavilion is built on the rooftop. There are also many decorations inside the mosque with various types of pattern and pierced floor carvings painted in the roof beams.

== Activities ==
The mosque used to be the political, religious and cultural center for Muslims in Shanghai. It was also the birthplace for Wu Ben Primary School, the first Islamic school in the modern history of Shanghai. However, the mosque currently serves as the service center for prayer and other Muslim activities in the city. It housed the home of the Shanghai Islamic Board of Directors, that was founded in 1909.

== Transportation ==
The mosque is accessible within walking distance east of Yuyuan Garden Station of Shanghai Metro.

== See also ==
Fuyou Road Mosque
- Simplified Chinese: 福佑路清真寺
Transcriptions
Standard Mandarin
- Hanyu Pinyin: Fúyòu Lù Qīngzhēnsì

- Islam in China
- List of mosques in China
