= Emin Minaret =

Minaret in Turfan, Xinjiang, China

Coordinates: 42.934330°N 89.20344°E

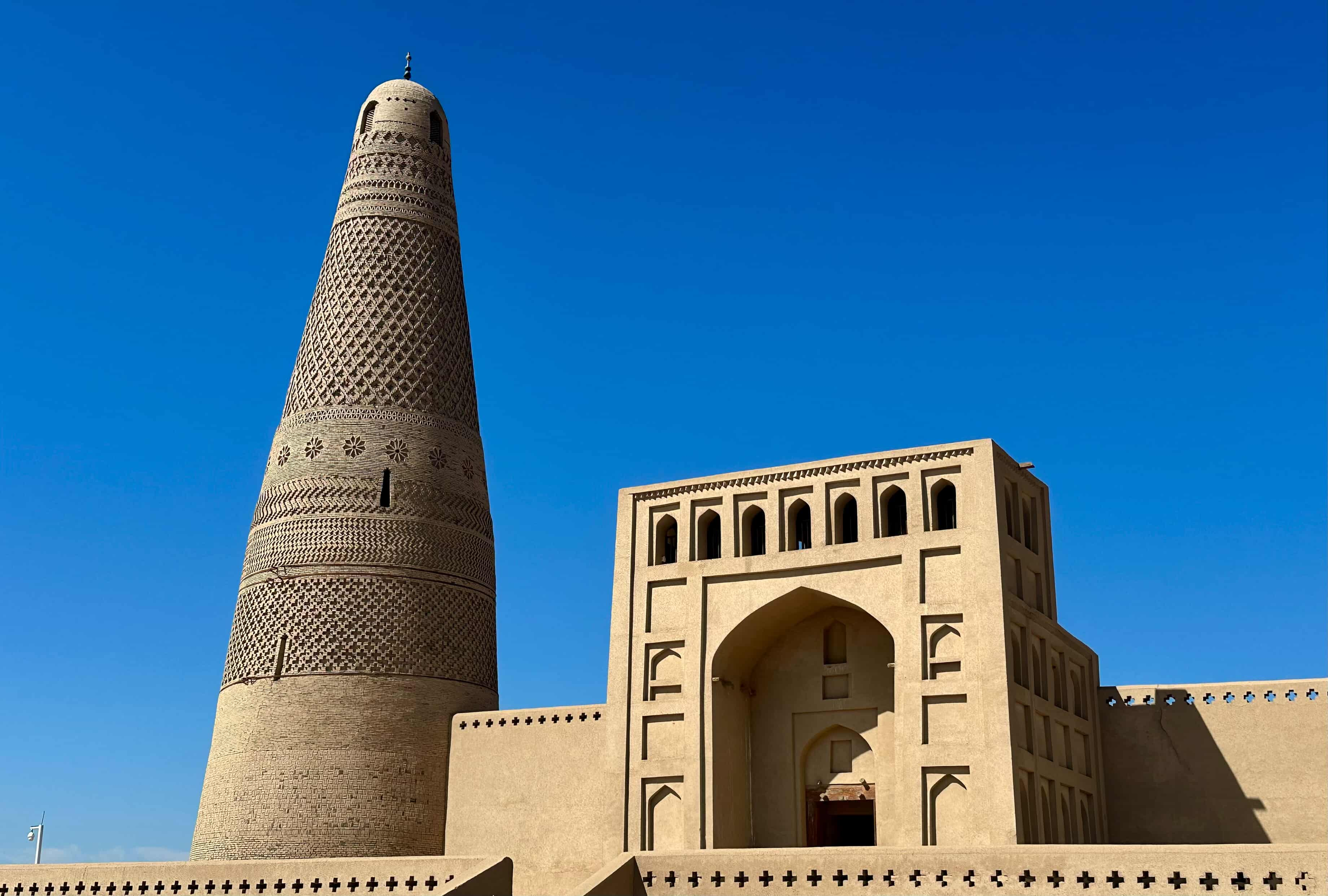
- Emin Minaret and Uyghur Mosque

Chinese name
- Traditional Chinese: 蘇公塔
- Simplified Chinese: 苏公塔
Transcriptions
Standard Mandarin
- Hanyu Pinyin: Sūgōng Tǎ
- Wade–Giles: Su^{1}-kung^{1} T'a^{3}

Alternative Chinese name
- Chinese: 额敏塔
- Literal meaning: Emin Minaret
Transcriptions
Standard Mandarin
- Hanyu Pinyin: É'mǐn Tǎ
- Wade–Giles: E^{2}'-min^{3} T'a^{3}

Persian name
- Persian: مناره امین

The Emin Minaret or Emin Tower stands by the Uyghur mosque located in Turfan, Xinjiang, China. At 44 meters (144 ft) it is the tallest minaret in China. The minaret is considered the most famous Islamic monument in the county. The Qing Empire conquered this largely Muslim region in the 1750s by defeating the Dzungar Mongols with their superior weaponry in a series of battles. The Uyghurs under Emin Khoja joined the Qing Empire for protection against the Dzungars and the Emin minaret was named after Emin Khoja.

The minaret was started in 1777 during the reign of the Qianlong Emperor (r. 1735–1796) and was completed only one year later. It was financed by local leaders and built to honor the exploits of a local Turpan general, Emin Khoja, hence the name "Emin". The Emin Minaret is located along the ancient Silk Route (near the ancient Uyghur capital of Gaochang). Nearby is the site of the Bezeklik Thousand Buddha Caves.

The arid landscape of southern Xinjiang has long been connected to both East Asia and West Asia by historical trade routes such as the Silk Road and the land around these crossroads became the location for most of the Uyghur Islamic structures in Xinjiang. The area has long served as a conduit for cultural exchange between different ethnic and religious groups. The Emin Minaret, like other Uyghur mosques and minarets, reflects this in its combination of traditional Islamic features and local Uyghur building traditions.

== Description ==
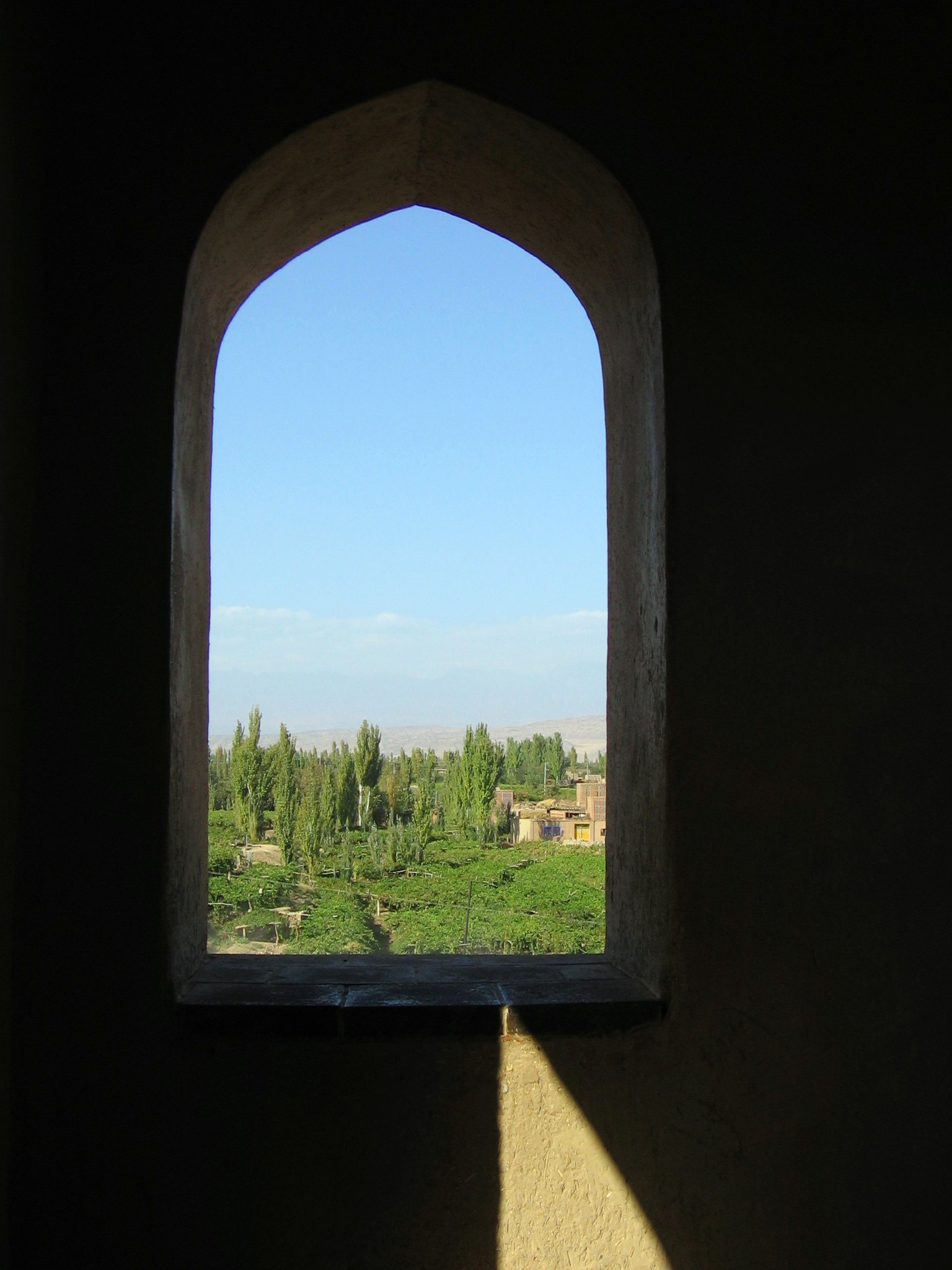
Minaret window

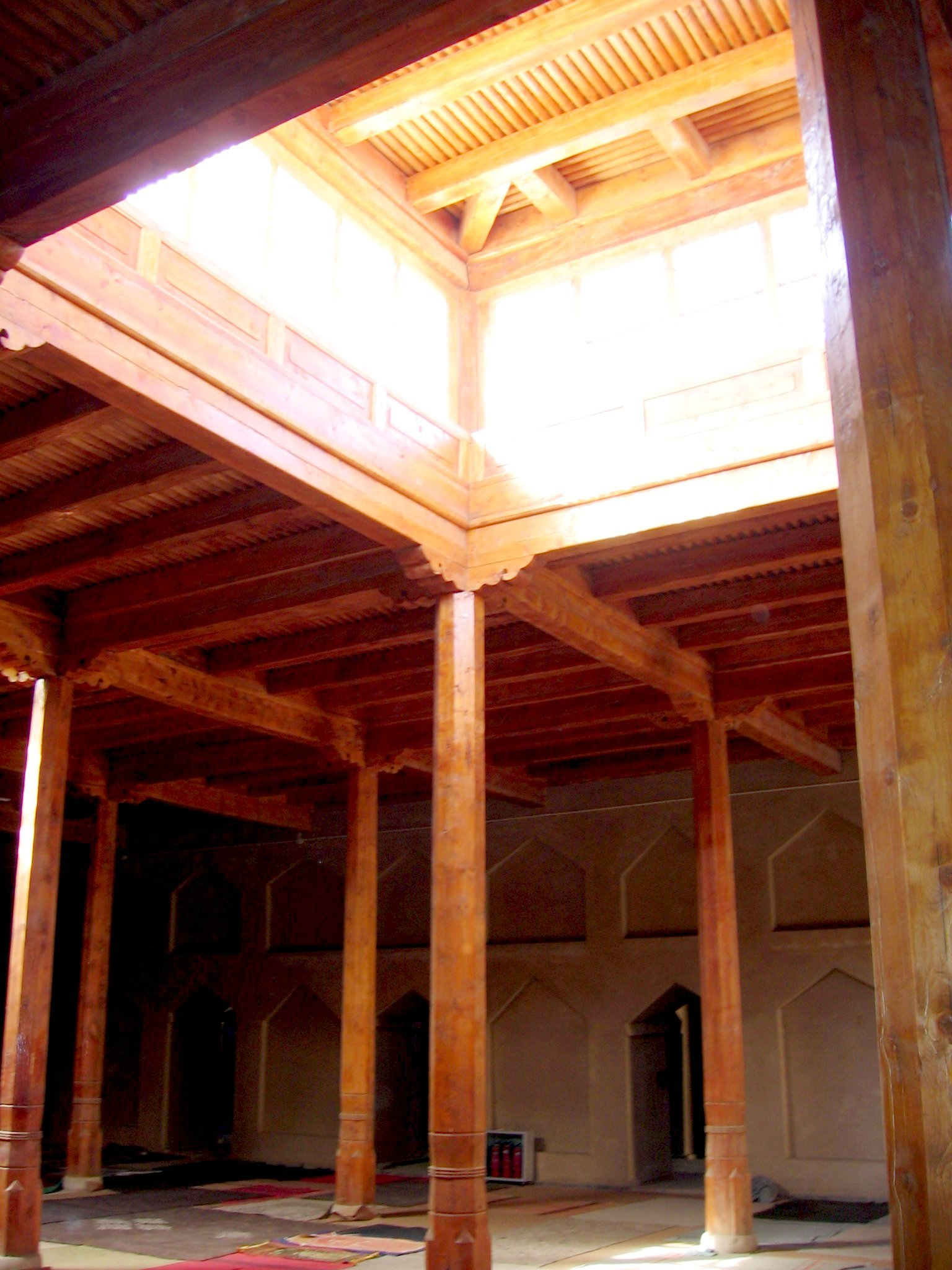
Inside mosque

The Emin Minaret was constructed by local craftsmen using local materials. The structure itself is made of wood and brick. It is an elegant, circular, tapered Islamic dome, with a diameter over 14 meters (46 feet) at its base and tapering to 2.8 meters at the top. The exterior is of sun-dried yellow bricks that narrow in shape as the tower rises. The richly textured bricks are carved into intricate, repetitive, geometric and floral mosaic patterns, such as stylized flowers and rhombuses. This mixture of Chinese and Islamic features is seen only in minarets in China. The unique geometric patterns are characteristic of Islamic architecture and have no counterparts in the architecture of China other than in Muslim structures. Positioned in the tower are several long, narrow windows at different heights and facing different directions that provide light and ventilation. The minaret has no stories. Inside, the spiraling internal support serves as a winding 72-step staircase to the top.

The Emin Minaret is on the southeast corner of the Uyghur Mosque, a rectangular structure with an iwan or mihrab, a pointed-arch niche enclosed on three sides but open to a large covered courtyard on the fourth. The mosque is divided into an inner hall for use in colder months and larger outer halls for warmer months. The outer halls are built with elegant, tall, thin, wooden pillars and beams supporting its exposed timber frame, and are open and spacious, while the inner hall is small and enclosed. Unlike Chinese structures, there are no images.

== Minaret ==
The towering architectural shape of a minaret, always taller than it is wide, is a clear sign of the presence of Islam as are the abstract, geometric decorative elements. Although the minaret has served many functions over time, in Islam its primary function has always been as the main lookout around which to draw members of the community. The ground floor of a minaret is always square while the higher parts may be of varying shapes, including round, square, or octagonal. The minaret is the most distinctive feature of any mosque and this is no different in the case of the Emin Minaret.

== See also ==
- Chinese mosques
