= Daowai Mosque =

Mosque in Harbin, Heilongjiang, China

- 道外清真寺
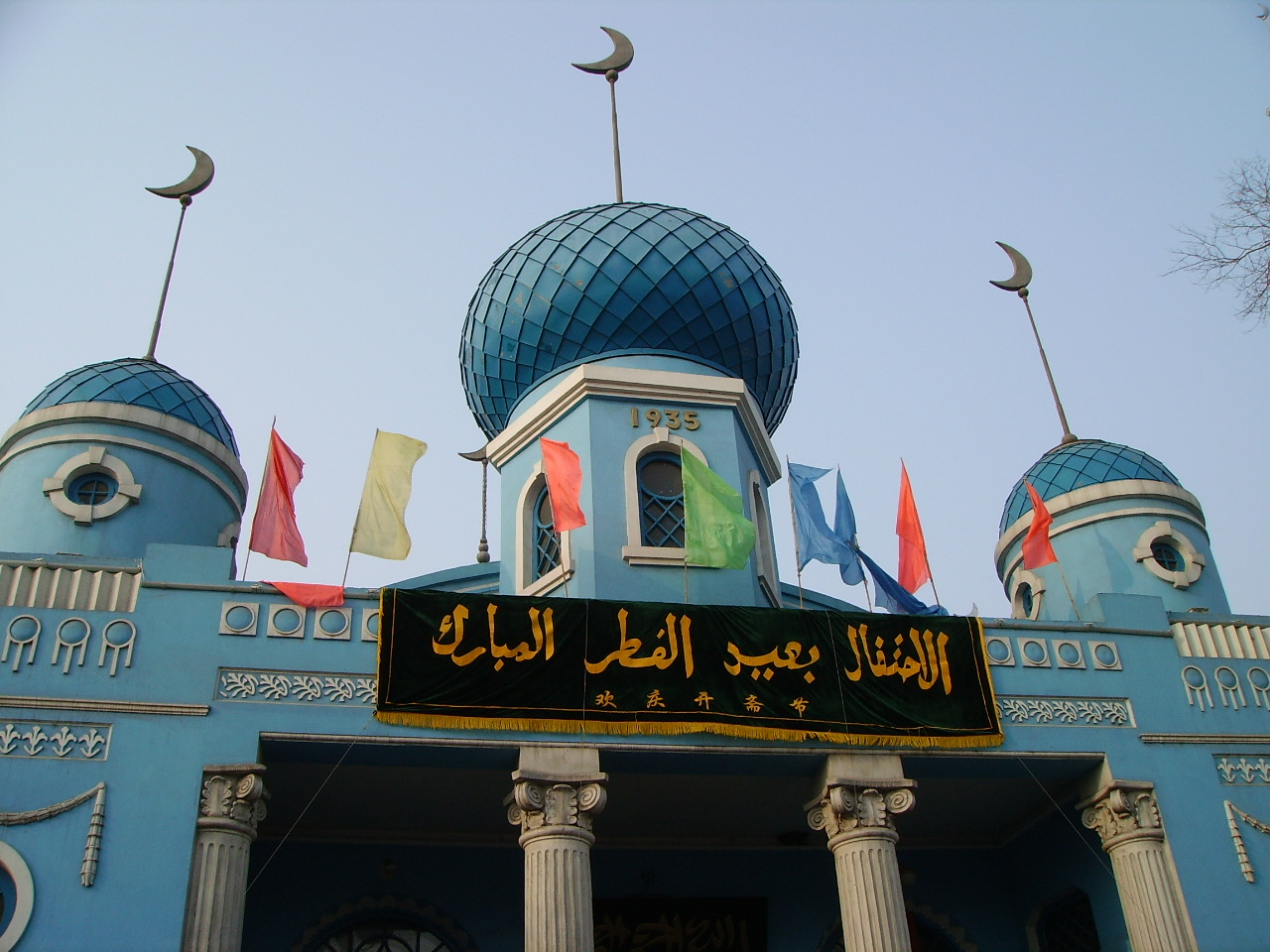

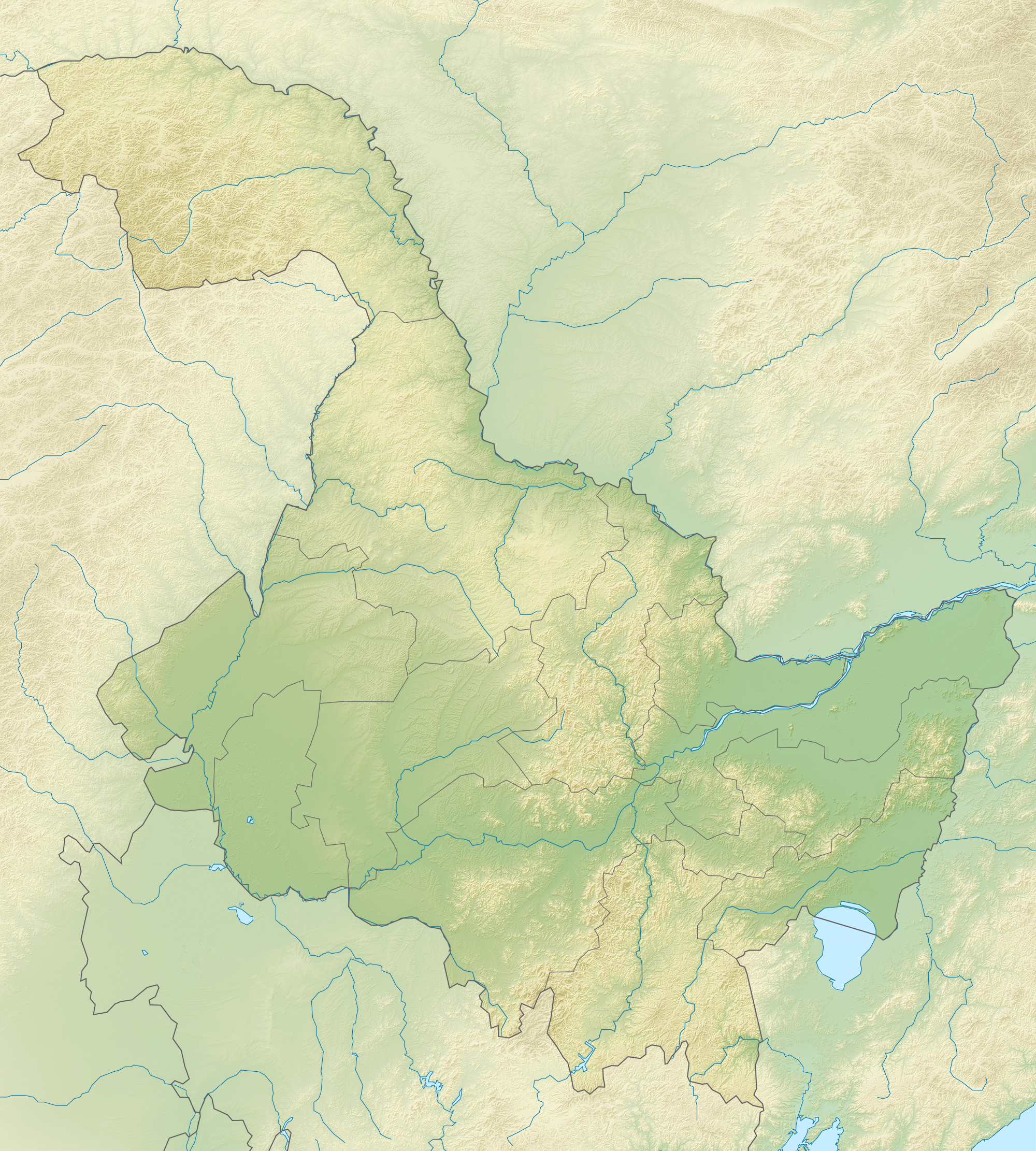
- Location of the mosque in Heilongjiang

Religion
- Affiliation: Sunni Islam
- Ecclesiastical or organizational status: Mosque
- Status: Active

Location
- Location: 270 Shisidao Street, Daowai, Harbin, Heilongjiang
- Country: China
- Interactive map of Daowai Mosque
- Coordinates: 45°47′14″N 126°39′04″E

Architecture
- Type: Mosque
- Style: Islamic; Russian; Chinese
- Completed: 1897

Specifications
- Capacity: 600 worshipers
- Interior area: 426 m^{2} (4,590 sq ft)
- Dome: 3 (maybe more)
- Minaret: 1
- Materials: Timber

The Daowai Mosque (Chinese: 道外清真寺; pinyin: Dàowài Qīngzhēnsì), also known as the Harbin Mosque, is a mosque in Daowai District, Harbin, in the Heilongjiang province of China. It is the largest mosque in the Heilongjiang province.

== History ==
The mosque was built in 1897, during the reign of the Guangxu Emperor of the Qing Dynasty. Extensions to the building were completed in 2003.

== Architecture ==
The mosque features an infusion of Islamic, Russian, and Chinese architectural styles that integrate elements like upturned eaves, timber structures, and decorative carvings with Islamic design principles. This synthesis blends traditional sahn layouts and Chinese‐style roofs with functional Islamic elements, highlighting the adaptability of Islamic architecture within local cultural contexts.

The mosque's wooden structure was built without nails using mortise and tenon techniques.

The mosque consists of prayer hall, office and other facilities. Covering an area of 426 square metres (4,590 sq ft), the prayer hall is located at the center of the building area which is opposite to the main gate. It can accommodate up to 600 worshipers.

== See also ==
Daowai Mosque
- Simplified Chinese: 道外清真寺
Transcriptions
Standard Mandarin
- Hanyu Pinyin: Dàowài Qīngzhēnsì

- Islam in China
- List of mosques in China
