= Nanning Mosque =

Mosque in Nanning, Guangxi, China

- 南宁清真寺
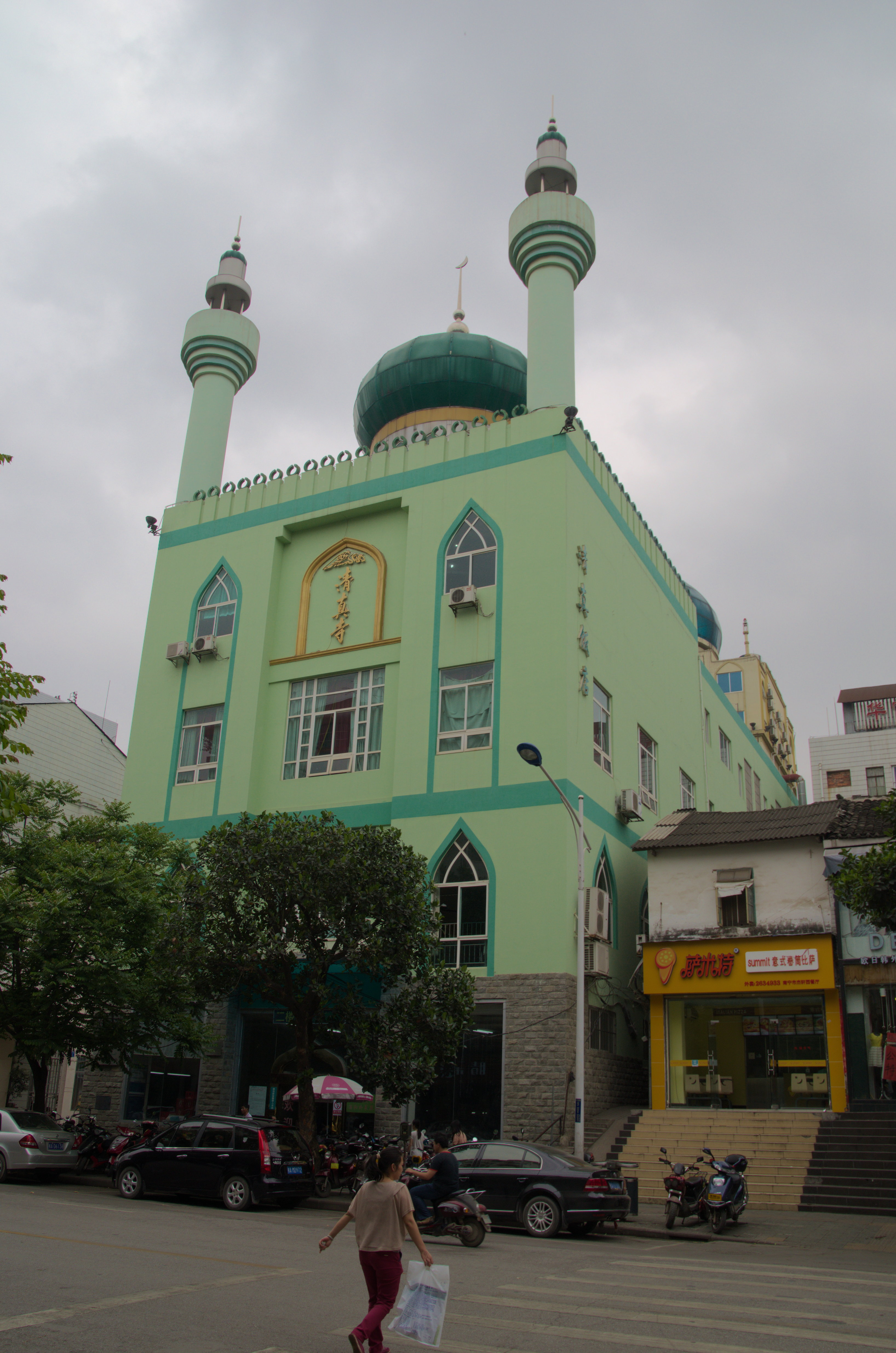

- Location of the mosque in Guangxi

Religion
- Affiliation: Sunni Islam
- Ecclesiastical or organizational status: Mosque
- Status: Active

Location
- Location: 25 Xinhua Street, Xingning, Nanning, Guangxi
- Country: China
- Interactive map of Nanning Mosque
- Coordinates: 22.81779°N 108.31418°E

Architecture
- Type: Mosque

Specifications
- Capacity: 200 worshippers
- Interior area: 1,890 m^{2} (20,300 sq ft)
- Dome: 1
- Minaret: 2

Chinese name
- Simplified Chinese: 南宁清真寺
- Traditional Chinese: 南寧清真寺
Transcriptions
Standard Mandarin
- Hanyu Pinyin: Nánníng Qīngzhēnsì

The Nanning Mosque (simplified Chinese: 南宁清真寺; traditional Chinese: 南寧清真寺; pinyin: Nánníng Qīngzhēnsì) is a mosque in Xingning District, Nanning City, in the Guangxi autonomous region of China.

== History ==
The mosque was built between 1644 and 1661, during the reign of the Qing dynasty Shunzhi Emperor. In 1717, the mosque was relocated to its current location. The mosque was closed and destroyed during the Cultural Revolution in 1966–1976 and was rebuilt in 1981.

== Architecture ==
The mosque is a three-story building which covers 1,890 square metres (20,300 sq ft) which can accommodate approximately 200 worshipers. It has Islamic style with conical roof and arch-style doors and windows. The first floor is used for restaurant area. The second floor is used for meeting room, office room and dormitory room. The third floor is the prayer hall.

== See also ==
- Islam in China
- List of mosques in China
