= Jama Mosque, Hotan =

Mosque in Hotan, Xinjiang, China

Jama Mosque
- 加买清真寺
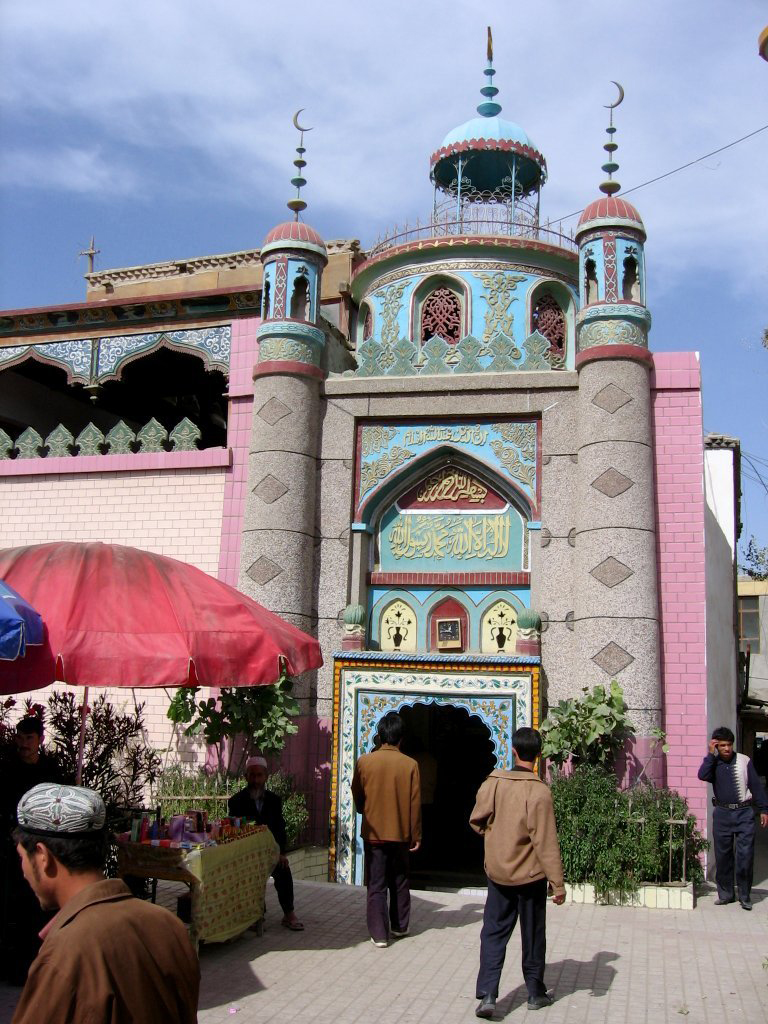

- Location of the mosque in southern Xinjiang

Religion
- Affiliation: Sunni Islam
- Ecclesiastical or organizational status: Mosque
- Status: Active

Location
- Location: Khotan, Xinjiang
- Country: China
- Interactive map of Jama Mosque
- Coordinates: 37.1125°N 79.9361°E

Architecture
- Type: Mosque
- Completed: 1870

Specifications
- Dome: 1
- Minaret: 1

Chinese name
- Simplified Chinese: 加买清真寺
Transcriptions
Standard Mandarin
- Hanyu Pinyin: Jiāmǎi Qīngzhēnsì

The Jama Mosque (Chinese: 加买清真寺; pinyin: Jiāmǎi Qīngzhēnsì) is the main mosque in Hotan, Xinjiang, China. It was built in 1870 and its patron is Habibullah Khan, the ruler of the temporary Khotan Khanate.

== See also ==
- Islam in China
- List of mosques in China
