= Women's Mosque of America =

Mosque in California, the United States

Coordinates: 34°2′44.002″N 118°16′27.001″W

The Women's Mosque of America

Religion
- Affiliation: Islam
- Ecclesiastical or organisational status: Active

Location
- Location: Los Angeles, California, United States
- Interactive map of The Women's Mosque of America

Architecture
- Completed: 2015

Website
- womensmosque.com

The Women's Mosque of America is a women's mosque based in Los Angeles, California. It is the first women-led Muslim house of worship in the United States, and it was founded by WGA comedy writer/director M. Hasna Maznavi to uplift the entire Muslim community by empowering the women within, and to spark the pathway towards a worldwide women-led Islamic Renaissance — one that is shaped by Muslim women's voices, participation, leadership, and scholarship. Maznavi had a childhood dream to build a mosque before she died as her sadaqa jariyah (ongoing charity), and she was further inspired by reading the Qur'an in English in entirety and her own study of Islamic history which revealed a rich history of female Muslim religious leadership before she decided to establish her dream mosque with rotating women khateebahs (preachers), which sets a precedent for women's leadership in American Islam.

The Women's Mosque of America had its first public town hall meeting on August 23, 2014. At the inaugural Jumu'ah on January 30, 2015, the khutbah was delivered by Edina Lekovic. The Women's Mosque of America had precedents in other countries in Muslim-majority nations and elsewhere, but this is the first such space in the United States. Southern California Muslim women meet for Friday prayers on a monthly basis, with some programming during the week. Housed in rented interfaith spaces in downtown Los Angeles, the mosque is led by women. The call to prayer, speeches on Islamic scholarship, Quran classes, and Friday sermon all come from women. The mosque permits men at some activities but is led by women and has discussions and classes dedicated to their concerns. The women's mosque represents the development of the Muslim community in America both internally and externally. American mosques established by new immigrant Muslims were sometimes ill-equipped to accommodate the needs of Muslim women in America, due to cultural interpretations of Islam which were limiting for women and not true to Qur'anic teachings.

After the mosque was founded, Maznavi wrote an article in the Huffington Post to explain the motivation for her work with The Women's Mosque of America. She tried to counter the image that the women's mosque represented a rebellion against both Muslim men and Islamic history. She wrote to clarify that The Women's Mosque of America was a revival of Islamic tradition as taught by Muhammad, and that Muslim men were involved and supportive of her work.

== Women's mosques ==
Women's mosques have offered female-only worship to Muslims at various times in Islamic history. Although Islamic scholarship shows Muslim women have led prayers since Islam's founding, Islamic scholars have debated whether women can lead the Friday sermon.

Women's mosques can be found in various countries, including China, India, Chile, Egypt, Palestine, Sudan, and Syria.
