= Women's mosque =

Women-led or women-only mosque

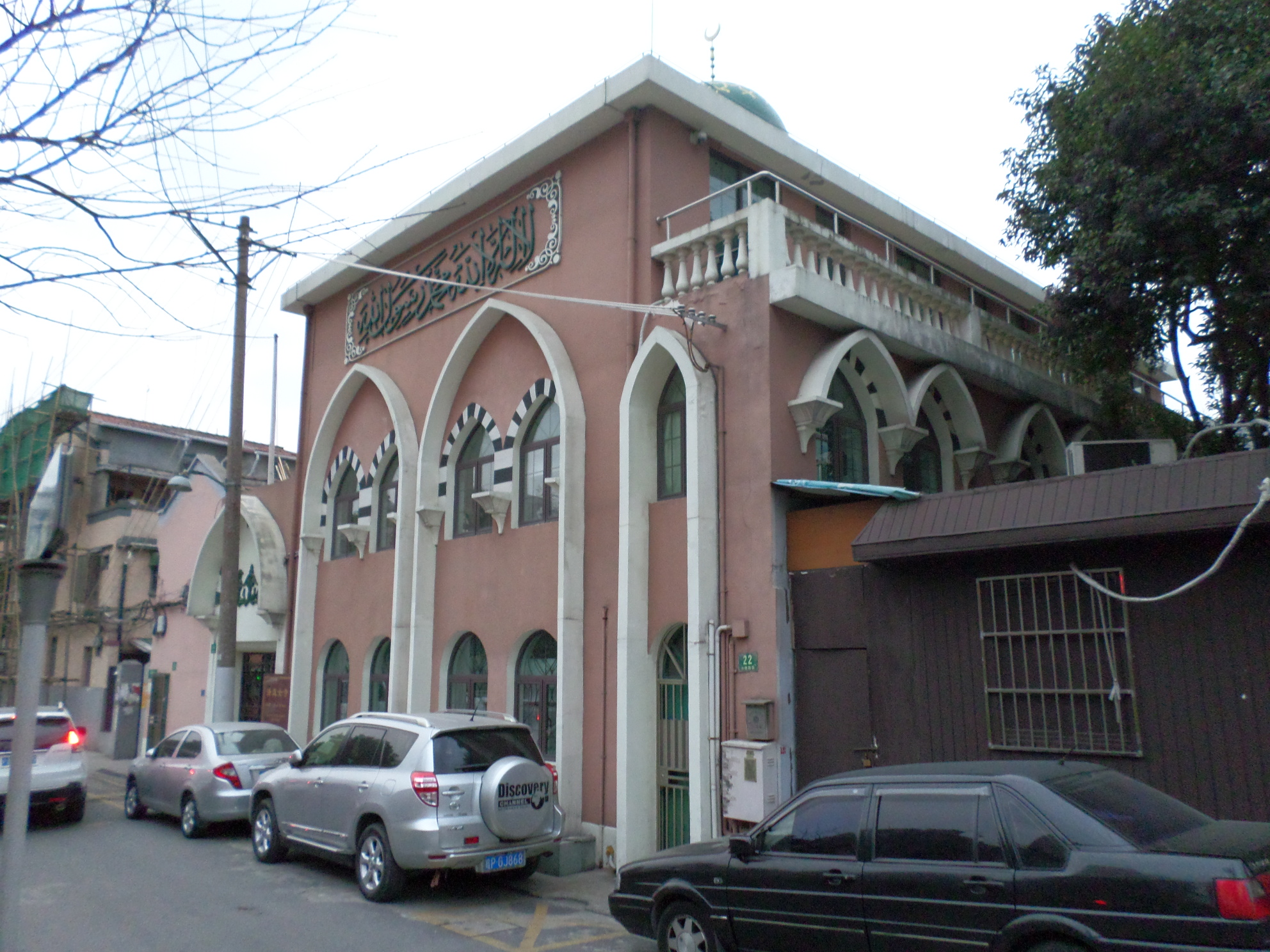
Xiaotaoyuan Women's Mosque in Shanghai, China.

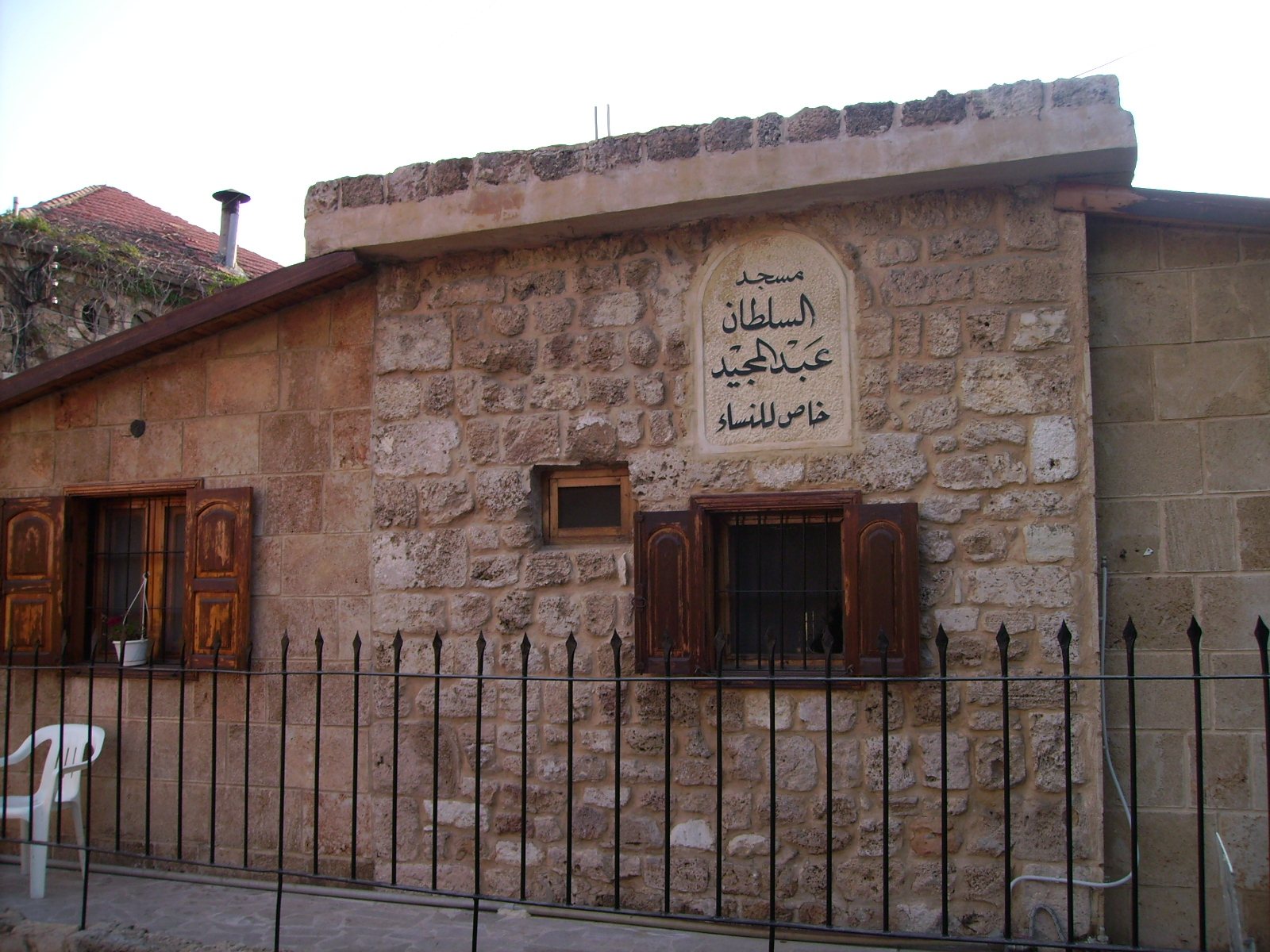
A women-only mosque in Byblos, Lebanon.

Women's mosques exist around the world, with a particularly rich tradition in China. As Islam has principles of segregating the sexes at times, many places of worship provide a dedicated prayer space for women within the main building, but in a few countries, separate buildings were constructed. In some cases, women were allowed to become imams.

In the 21st century, many countries have seen women-led or women-only mosques created, as part of liberal movements within Islam.

== Asia ==
=== China ===
Women's mosques (Chinese: [清真]女寺; pinyin: [Qīngzhēn] nǚsì) have existed in China for several hundred years. They can be found in the provinces of Henan, Shanxi, Shaanxi and Hebei.

In China, separate women-only mosques were built by the Muslim communities. At the end of the Ming dynasty and early Qing dynasty, Hui women had begun to form their own mosques. The oldest surviving women's mosque in China, is Wangjia Hutong Women's Mosque of Kaifeng, which dates to 1820.

For religious reasons, Hui communities had started to cultivate more theological learning among the women. As a result, a portion of the female Muslims who had experienced a religious education, gradually incorporated Islamic observances into their daily religious activities, and this produced the establishment of women's mosques.

By the 20th century, there were separate places of worship as women-only mosques. They are a special form of the sacred building, either as a separate institution or mosque attached to an existing larger mosque. Their managers are women, wives of the imam of a larger mosque. The commonly used title for it is Shiniang (师娘).

Female Islamic clerics are referred to as nü ahong (女阿訇) in Chinese.

In the province of Henan:

- Beidajie Nusi, Zhengzhou
- Beixiajie Nusi, Zhengzhou
- Minzhulu Nusi, Zhengzhou
- Xishilipu Nusi, Zhengzhou
- Hexi Nusi, Zhoukou
- Tiedanjie Nüsi, Kaifeng, one of 16 women's mosques in that city

Elsewhere:

- Jiangfanglu Nusi, Xi'an (Shaanxi)
- Qian Xinchengdao Nusi (Hohhot Nüsi), Hohhot (Inner Mongolia)
- Botou Qingzhen Nüsi, Botou, Cangzhou City (Hebei)
- Beijing (Women's mosque, jap.)
- Xiaotaoyuan Mosque, Shanghai

=== Maldives ===
In the Maldives, there are women's mosques located in many islands and atolls, a tradition which possibly dates back to earlier times due to the influence women have historically wielded in Maldivian society. It was a Maldivian practice to maintain such mosques, known as nisha miskii, which were separate buildings run by female equivalents of mudimu (male mosque caretakers) known as mudahim. The women's mosques are not on every single island, and an example of this is the capital island, where mosques have a separate area for women within larger mosques. In 2005, there was an estimated number of over 250 women's mosques spread out among the 250 inhabited islands.

In late 2009 and 2010, all of the Maldives’ nisha miskii seemed to have closed. The Ministry of Islamic Affairs of the Maldives closed the mosques claiming that they were expensive to maintain and rarely used. As of 2018, available accounts indicate that women's mosques no longer exist in the Maldives.

=== India ===
In the union territory of Lakshadweep, oral traditions suggest the establishment of women's mosques in the area. According to the few mentions of women's mosques in the region, there were reportedly small private buildings that were attended by women with female leadership. A similar institution exists in the island of Minicoy, where prayer houses for women are called namād-ge.

=== Other Asian countries ===
- Bukhara, see Islam in Uzbekistan
- Kabul, see Islam in Afghanistan
- Maldives, see Islam in the Maldives
- Padang and Yogyakarta, see Islam in Indonesia
- Byblos, see Islam in Lebanon
- Medina, see Islam in Saudi Arabia

== Africa ==
- Khartoum, see Islam in Sudan
- Gabiley, see Islam in Somalia

== Europe ==
- Amsterdam, see Islam in the Netherlands
- Berlin, see Islam in Germany. Seyran Ateş founded the Ibn Ruschd-Goethe mosque in 2017
- Copenhagen, see Islam in Denmark. Sherin Khankan founded the Mariam Mosque in 2016

== North America ==
- The Women's Mosque of America, Los Angeles, California. The first women's mosque in the United States opened in 2015, located in a multifaith cultural centre in the Pico-Union district.
- Qal'bu Maryam Women's Mosque, Oakland, California. The first women's mosque in the San Francisco Bay area, and the second in the United States, opened March 4, 2017, is located in the City of Refuge Church in Oakland.
- The Women's Mosque of Canada was established in Toronto in April 2019. The mosque started with space at Trinity-St. Paul's United Church.

== See also ==
- Women as imams
- Women in Islam
- Liberalism and progressivism within Islam

== Bibliography ==
- (in English) Jaschok, Maria (2005). Religious Women in a Chinese City: Ordering the past, recovering the future – Notes from fieldwork in the central Chinese province of Henan (PDF) (Technical report). QEH Working Paper Series. Queen Elizabeth House, University of Oxford. Working Paper Number 124.
- Jaschok, Maria (2005-04-23). "Religious women in a Chinese city: Ordering the past, recovering the future". Kvinder, Køn & Forskning (1–2). doi:10.7146/kkf.v0i1-2.28127. ISSN 0907-6182.
- (in English) Jaschok, Maria; Shui, Jingjun (2000). The History of Women's Mosques in Chinese Islam: A Mosque of Their Own. Richmond, Surrey: Curzon Press. ISBN 978-0-7007-1302-8. (the Chinese edition's title was: Zhongguo Qingzhen nüsi shi 中国清真女寺史 (水镜君/ (英)玛利亚•雅绍克), ISBN 978-7-108-01699-7; cf. preview)
- (in English) Hsiung, Ping-Chun; Jaschok, Maria; Milwertz, Cecilia (2001-11-01). Chinese Women Organizing: Cadres, Feminists, Muslims, Queers. Berg Publishers. p. 304. doi:10.4324/9781003084921. ISBN 978-1-85973-541-1. LCCN 2001002959. OCLC 51299833. OL 19058713W. Archived. Preview.
- (in English) Jaschok, Maria; Shui, Jingjun (2003). "Restoring history to women, restoring women to history: reconstructing the evolution of Qingzhen Nüsi (women's mosques) in China's Islam". Pakistan Journal of Women's Studies: Alam-e-Niswan. 10 (2). University of Karachi: 153–173.
- (in French) Allès, Elisabeth (1999). "Des oulémas femmes : le cas des mosquées féminines en Chine". Revue du monde musulman et de la Méditerranée (in French). 85 (1): 215–236. doi:10.3406/remmm.1999.2646. ISSN 0997-1327.
- (in French) icampus.ucl.ac.be "Les minorités musulmanes en Chine" ("Les mosquées féminines")
- Jaschok, Maria (2024-11-06). Inside the Expressive Culture of Chinese Women's Mosques: 'This Turmoil of the Soul'. Routledge contemporary china series. London New York: Routledge, Taylor & Francis. doi:10.4324/9781032618609 (inactive 8 July 2026). hdl:20.500.12657/94011. ISBN 978-1-032-61860-9. LCCN 2024020763. OCLC 1458764976. OL 52558736M. Archived (PDF) from the original on 2025-12-12.
