= Edina Leković =

American activist

Edina Leković is the inaugural Community Scholar in Residence with UCLA's Islamic Studies Program and the Fowler Museum, where is researching and sharing the history of Muslim Los Angeles. She also serves as the Executive Director of the Robert Ellis Simon Foundation, which supports mental wellness services for L.A. County’s most vulnerable residents. Her expertise in storytelling, strategic communications, media relations, leadership development and interfaith community building have been shaped, tested and honed over 25 years of service to advance the cause of American Muslims.

== Career ==
Leković has appeared on leading media outlets, including CNN, MSNBC, FOX News, NPR, Al-Jazeera and BuzzFeed. In 2015, she was named one of L.A.’s “10 Most Inspiring Women Game Changers” by Los Angeles Magazine after she gave the historic first sermon at the Women's Mosque of America. She was also named one of the "500 Most Influential Muslims in the World" by Georgetown University and the Royal Islamic Strategic Studies Centre in 2009.

Leković is a Montenegrin American whose parents are from Bar, Montenegro in the former Yugoslavia. She completed her graduate work in Communication at Pepperdine University and received her B.A. in American Literature & Culture. In 1997-98, she served as Editor-in-Chief of the Daily Bruin which was named a top student publication in the country by the Society of Professional Journalists.

From 2000 to 2004, she served as Managing Editor of The Minaret, an American Muslim magazine published monthly from 1978-2004. During that time, she also co-founded Elev8, an arts-based youth leadership program for Muslim Angelenos. She worked with the Muslim Public Affairs Council from 2004 to 2014 as an advocate on behalf of American Muslims in news media, interfaith, community, and pop culture spaces -- first as Communications Director and then as Director of Policy & Programs. In 2006, she co-founded NewGround, an organization to foster communication between Muslim and Jewish Angelenos, and she continues to serve on the board of directors. She was also on the founding team of the American Muslim Civic Leadership Institute, housed at USC's Center for Religion and Civic Culture, and is also a proud alum.
