= Chinese Islamic architecture =

Architectural tradition and cultural heritage of Chinese Muslims

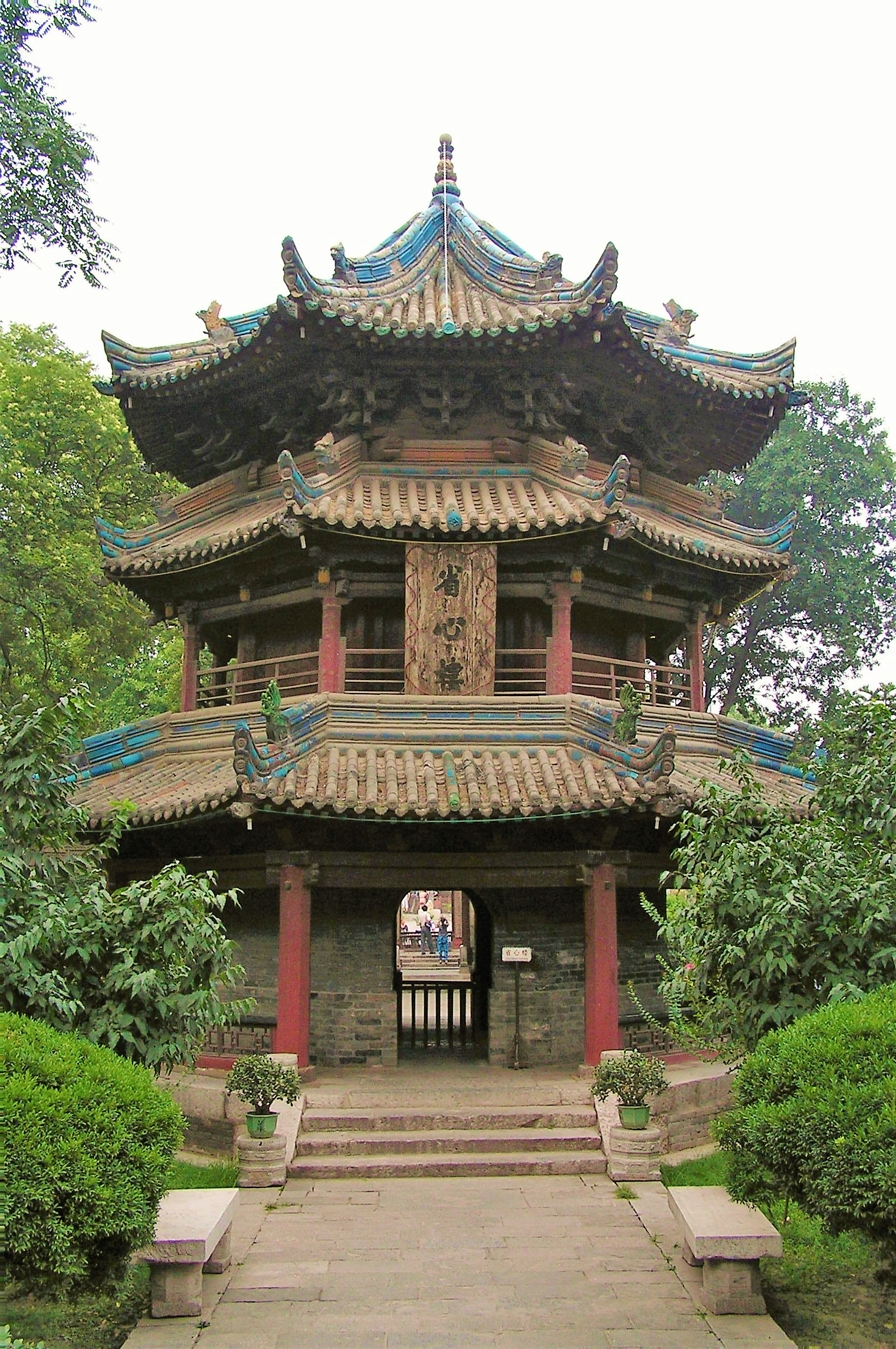
The Great Mosque of Xi'an, one of the oldest mosques in China

Chinese Islamic architecture, Sino-Islamic architecture, or Islamic architecture of China are terms used to indicate the architectural tradition and cultural heritage of the Muslim populations in China, both of mainland and outer China, which has existed since the 8th century CE to the present. With the acculturation of the Islamic religion within the predominant Han-Chinese culture, a unique architectural style emerged among Chinese Muslims. It became standard for them to incorporate traditional Chinese and Islamic architectural elements together for mosques, prayer halls, mausoleums, and other buildings.

Islam has been practiced in Chinese society for 1,300 years. Currently, Chinese Muslims are a minority group in China, representing between 0.45% to 1.8% of the total population according to the latest estimates. Although Hui Muslims are the most numerous group, the greatest concentration of Chinese Muslims are located in Northwestern China, mostly in the autonomous region of Xinjiang, which holds a significant Uyghur population. Lesser but significant Chinese Muslim populations reside in the regions of Ningxia, Gansu, and Qinghai. Of China's 55 officially recognized minority peoples, ten groups are predominantly Sunnī Muslim.

== Background ==
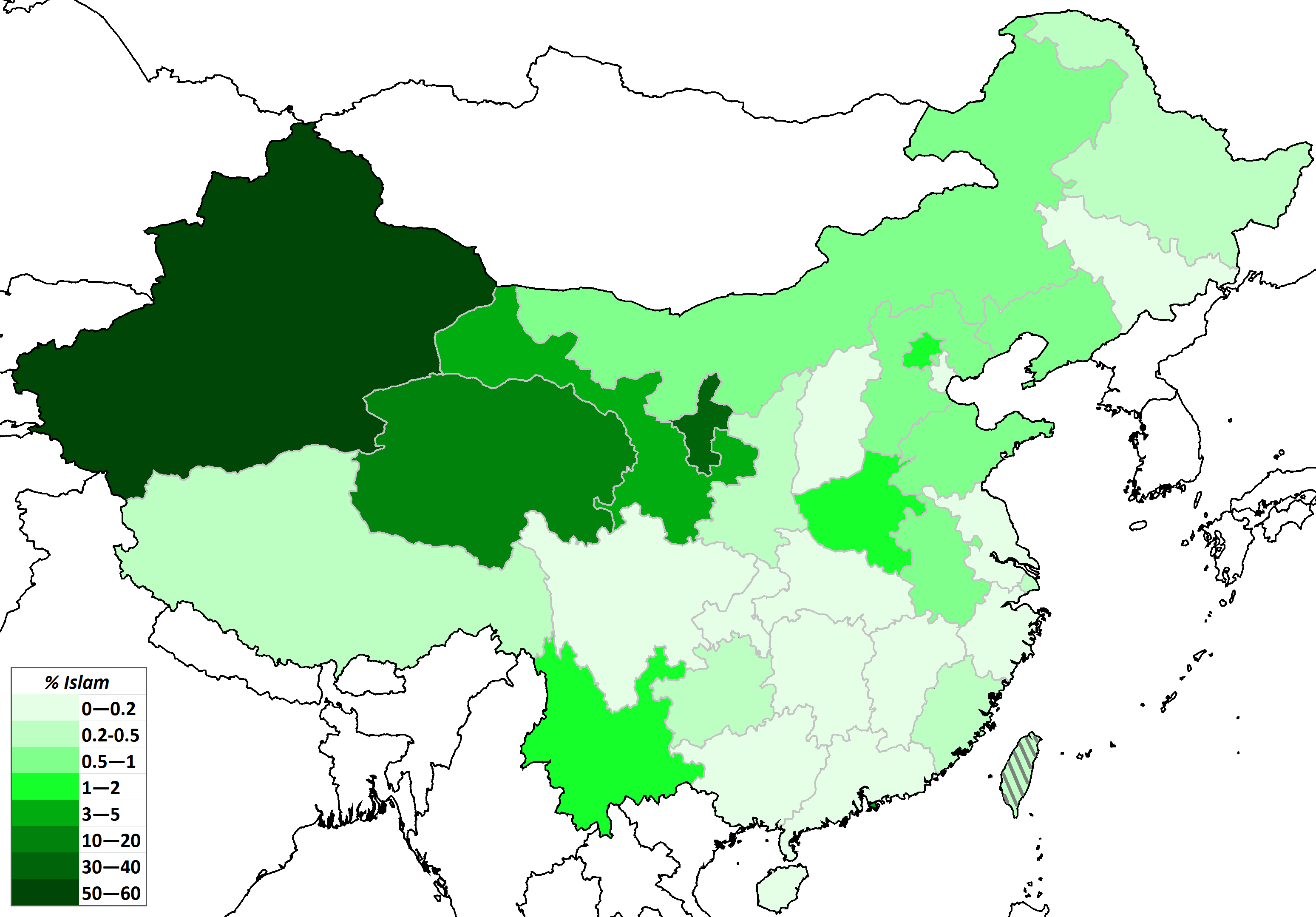
Mapping of Islam by province of China according to the latest Government Census (2011); Muslims account for 1.45% of the total population. (Note: CFPS 2014 surveyed predominantly people of Han ethnicity. This may have resulted in an underestimation of Muslims. CGSS 2006–2010 surveys found an average 2–3% of the population of China declaring to be Muslim.)

The history of Islam in China goes back to the earliest years of Islam. According to Chinese Muslims' traditional legendary accounts, Muslim missionaries reached China through an embassy sent by ʿUthmān ibn ʿAffān (644–656), the third rāshidūn caliph, in 651 CE, less than twenty years after the death of Muhammad (632 CE). Saʿd ibn Abī Waḳḳāṣ, the maternal uncle and second cousin of Muhammad, was sent with a delegation to meet the Chinese Gaozong Emperor. The construction of Huaisheng Mosque in Guangzhou, the first mosque in the country, is attributed to him.

According to traditional Chinese Muslim legendary accounts, Islam was first introduced to China in 616–618 CE by some of Muhammad's closest companions (ṣaḥāba): Saʿd ibn Abī Waḳḳāṣ, Sayid, Wahb Abu Kabcha, and another one. Wahb Abu Kabcha may have been be a son of al-Ḥārth ibn ʿAbdul al-ʿUzzā (also known as Abu Kabsha). It is reported in other accounts that Wahb Abu Kabcha reached Guangzhou by sea in 629 CE.

While modern historians state that there is no evidence for Waḳḳāṣ himself ever coming to China, they do believe that Muslim diplomats and merchants arrived to Tang China within a few decades from the beginning of the Muslim era. The Tang dynasty's cosmopolitan culture, with its intensive contacts spread across Central Asia and its significant communities of (originally Non-Muslim) Central and West Asian merchants resident in Chinese cities, which helped the introduction of Islam. The first major Muslim settlements in China consisted of Arab and Persian merchants.

During and after the Arab Muslim invasion of Transoxiana, the Umayyad Caliphate deposed Ikhshid, king of the Fergana Valley, in 715 CE, and installed a new king on the throne, Alutar. The deposed king fled to Kucha (seat of Anxi Protectorate), and sought Chinese intervention. The Chinese sent 10,000 troops under Zhang Xiaosong to Ferghana. He defeated Alutar and the Arab Muslim occupation forces at Namangan, reinstalling Ikhshid on the throne. Arab sources also report that Qutayba ibn Muslim briefly took Kashgar from China towards 714 CE and withdrew after an agreement, but modern historians entirely dismiss this claim.

== Tang dynasty ==
The earliest extant religious structures that display features of Chinese Islamic architecture are the Great Mosque of Xi'an, built in 742 (according to an engraving on a stone tablet preserved inside the building), and the Daxuexi Alley Mosque in Xi'an. The latter was built in 705, according to one inscription attributed to the Emperor Jiajing of the Ming dynasty.

Multiple other mosques were established during the Tang, including the Shengyou Mosque in Quanzhou, the Phoenix Mosque in Hangzhou, the Taiyuan Old Mosque in Shanxi, and more. Around 13 mosques were recorded to exist by the late Tang period.

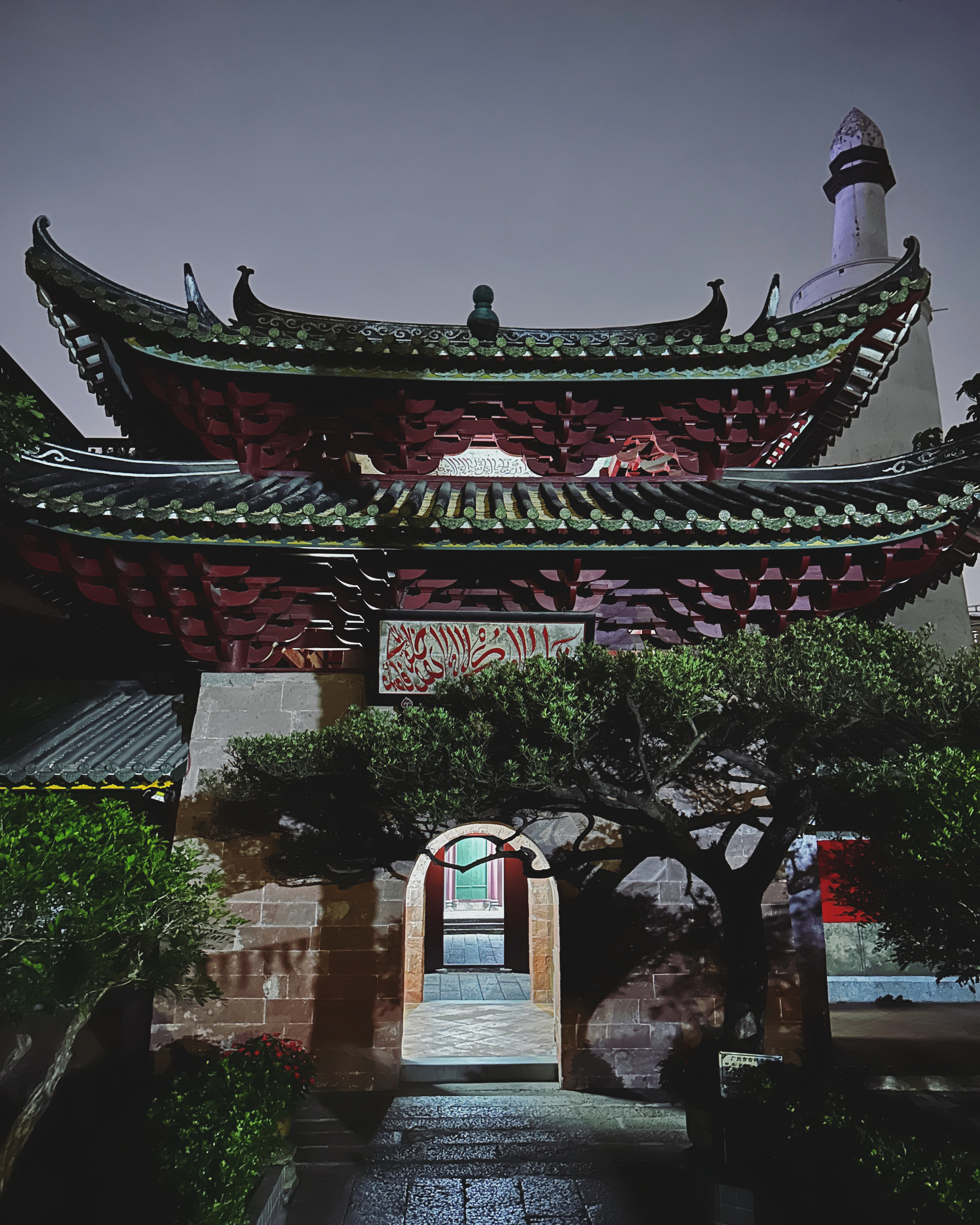
Huaisheng Mosque (in Guangzhou) entrance and minaret, considered to be the oldest mosque in China

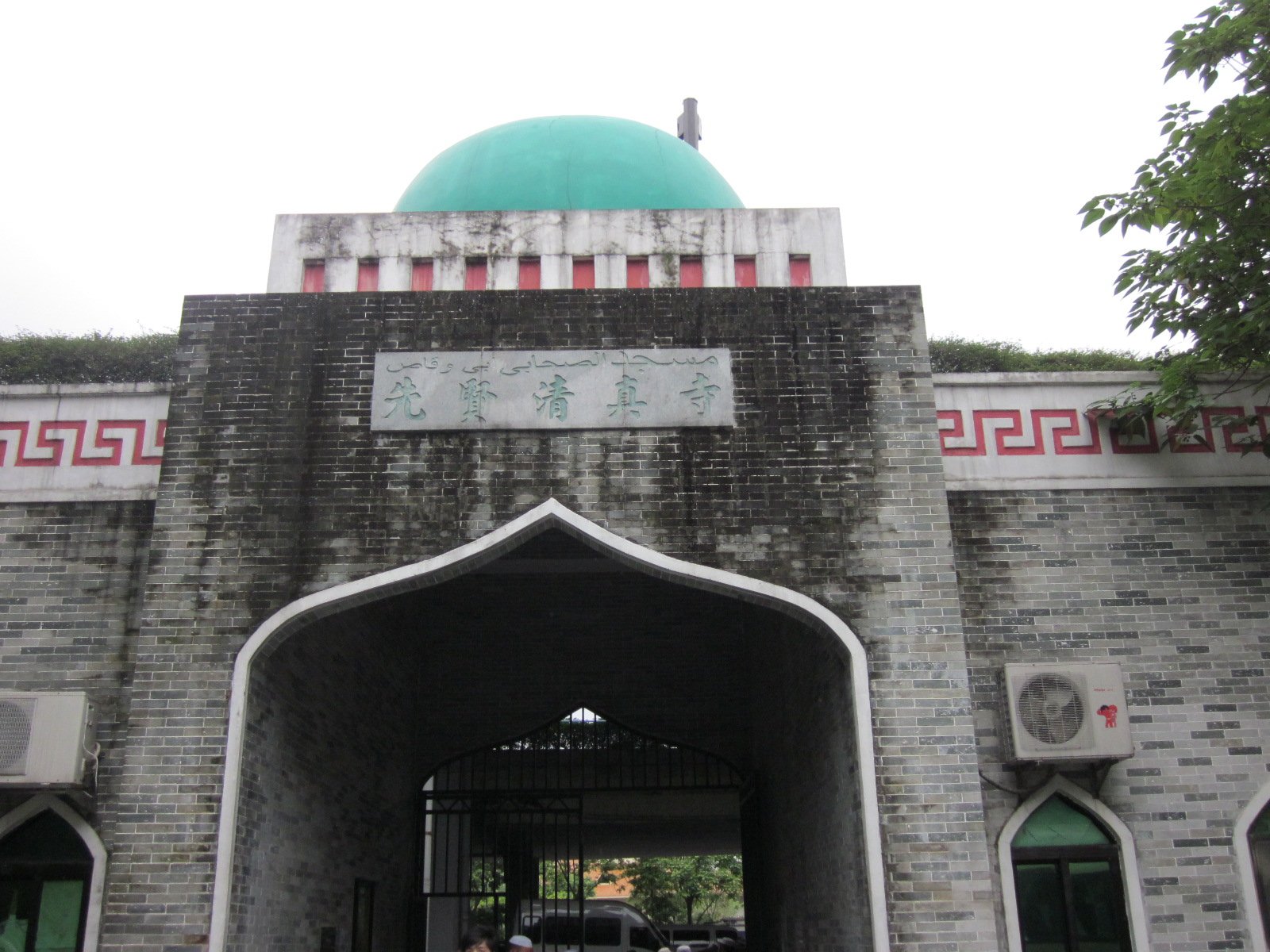
Xianxian Mosque (in Guangzhou)

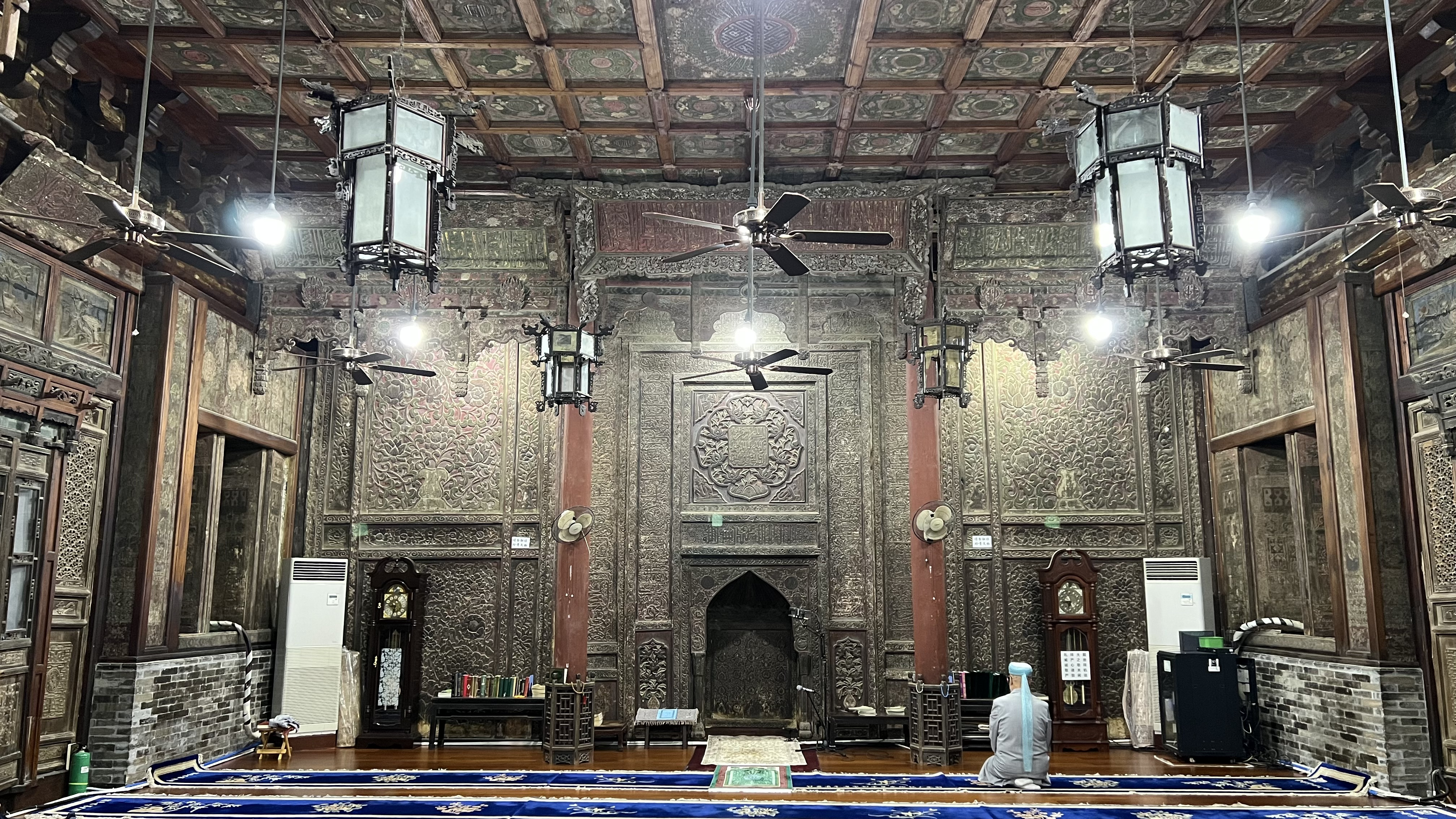
Prayer hall of the Great Mosque of Xi'an

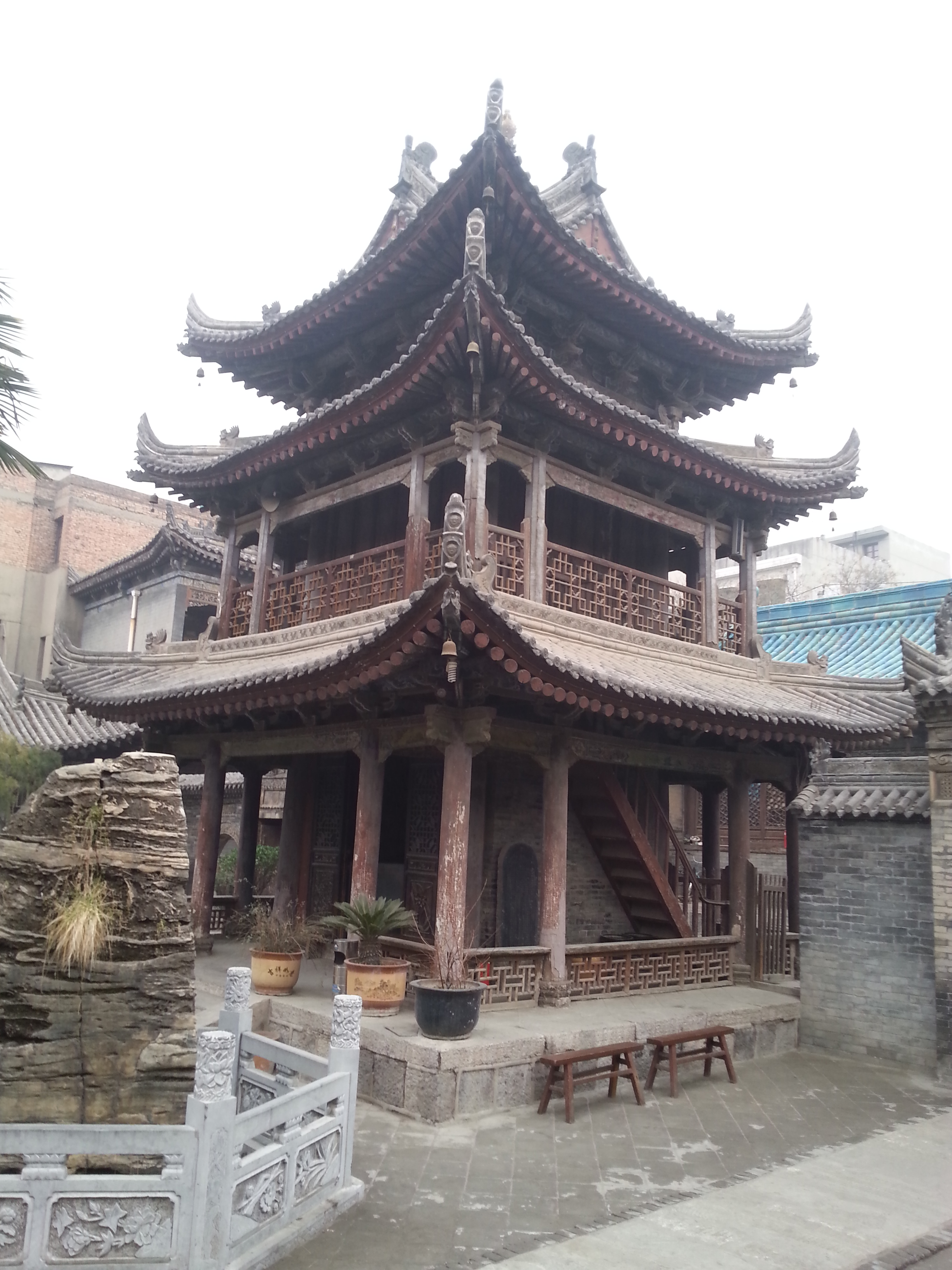
Minaret of the Daxuexi Alley Mosque in Xi'an

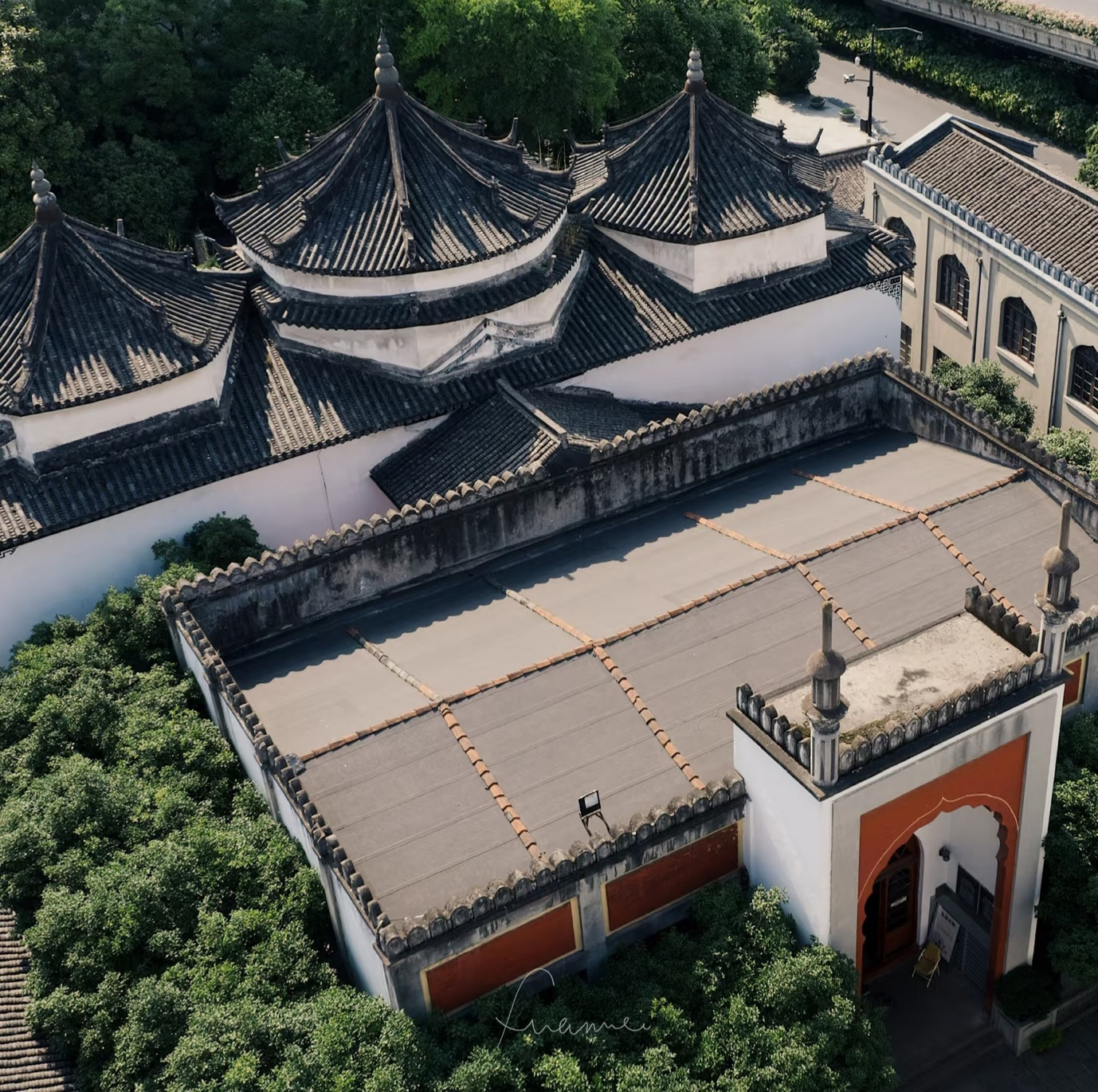
Hangzhou's Phoenix Mosque dating to the Tang Dynasty

== Liao and Song dynasties ==
There are many examples of Chinese Islamic structures built under the Song and Liao dynasties, such as the Niujie Mosque (simplified Chinese: 牛街礼拜寺; traditional Chinese: 牛街禮拜寺; pinyin: Niújiē lǐbàisì; Wade–Giles: Niu-chieh Li-pai-ssu "Oxen Street House of Worship" or Chinese: 牛街清真寺; pinyin: Niújiē Qīngzhēnsì; Wade–Giles: Niu-chieh Ch'ing-chen-ssu "Oxen Street Mosque"), who is the oldest mosque in Beijing. It was first built in 996 under the Liao dynasty, and was subsequently reconstructed as well as enlarged under the Chenghua Emperor of the Ming dynasty, who granted the mosque financial support in 1474, and the Kangxi Emperor (r. 1661–1722) of the Qing dynasty. Another notable Chinese Islamic building is the Huaisheng Mosque in Guangzhou. By the late Song dynasty, 28 mosques were recorded in China, with 15 of those being constructed during the Song period.

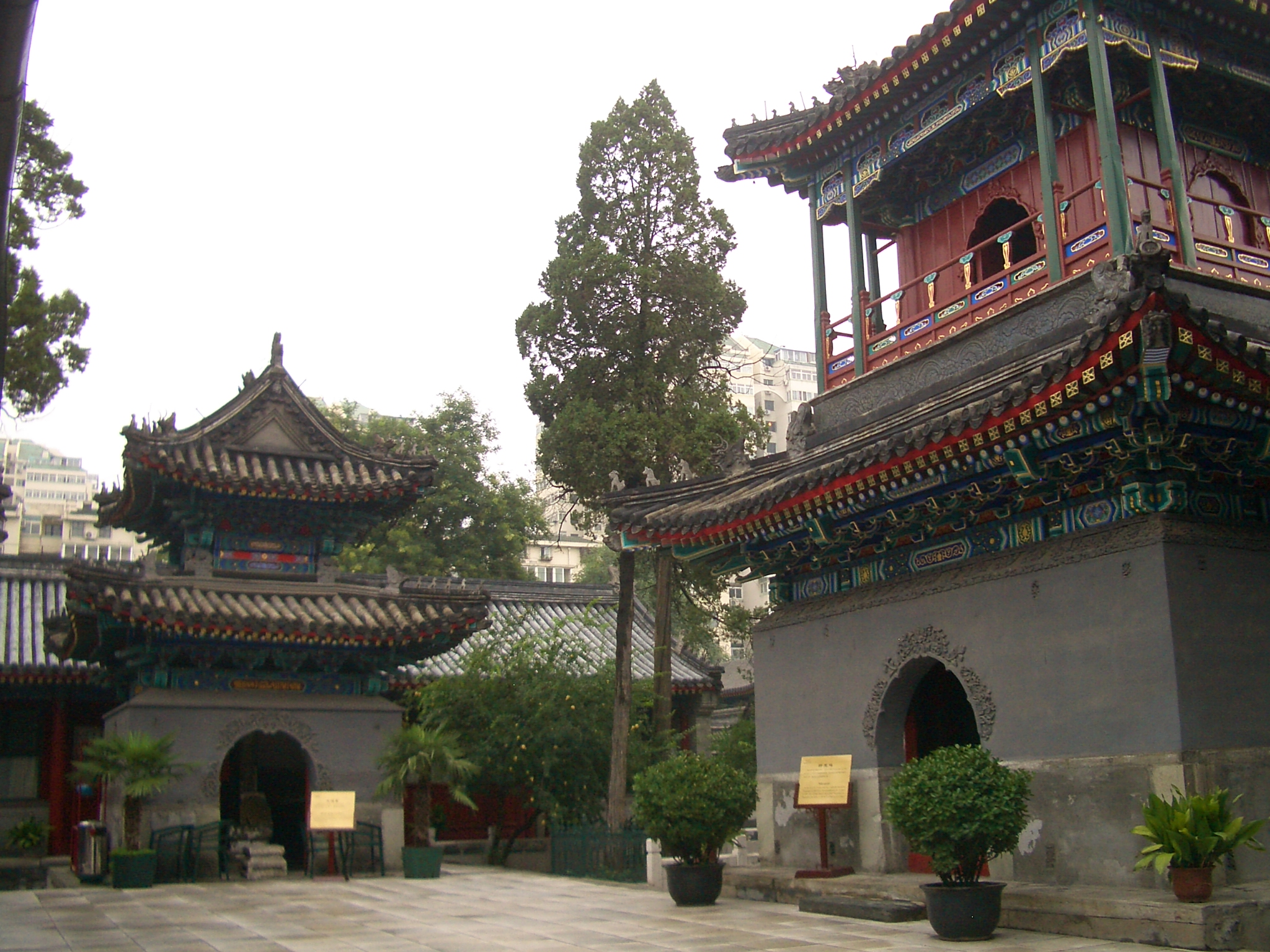
Niujie Mosque in Beijing, established in 996 CE during the Liao dynasty

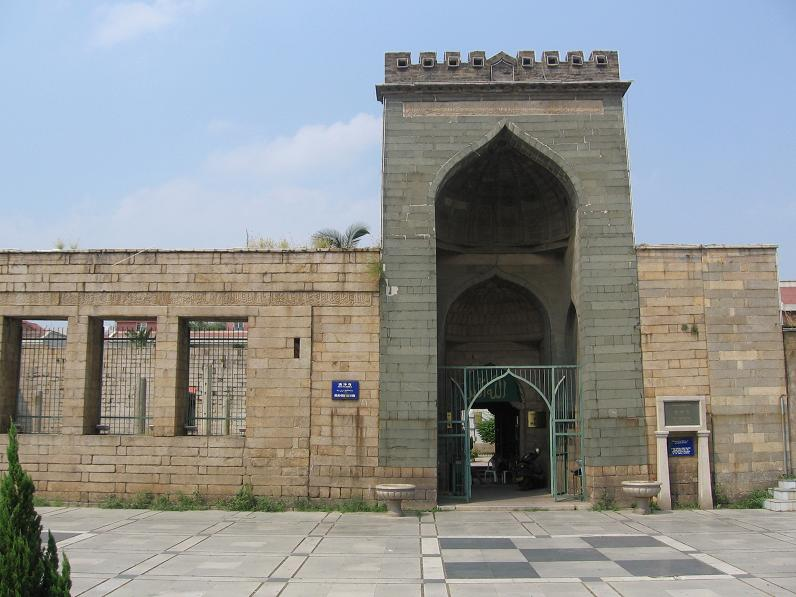
Qingjing Mosque in Quanzhou Constructed in 1009 CE, and influenced by Arabic (Islamic) architecture

== Yuan dynasty ==
The Yuan period has been considered a golden age for Islamic architecture in China, with many mosques being established during this period. Mosques were centered around the north China plain, the northwest, and the Yunnan region. Under the Yuan dynasty, Chinese Muslims began referring to their mosques as qingzhensi ("temple of purity and truth"). There are many examples of Chinese Islamic architecture built during the Yuan period, such as the Dongsi Mosque (北京东四清真寺) in Beijing, which was enlarged under the Ming dynasty; the Tongzhou Mosque (北京通州清真寺) in Beijing; the Qingjing Mosque (泉州清净寺) in Quanzhou, which is the only structure that features stone entrances; and the Hangzhou Fenghuang Mosque (杭州风凰寺). This period was characterized by an increased and widespread use of Islamic architectural elements, such as high entrances, domes, transition zones, and the use of bricks and stones.

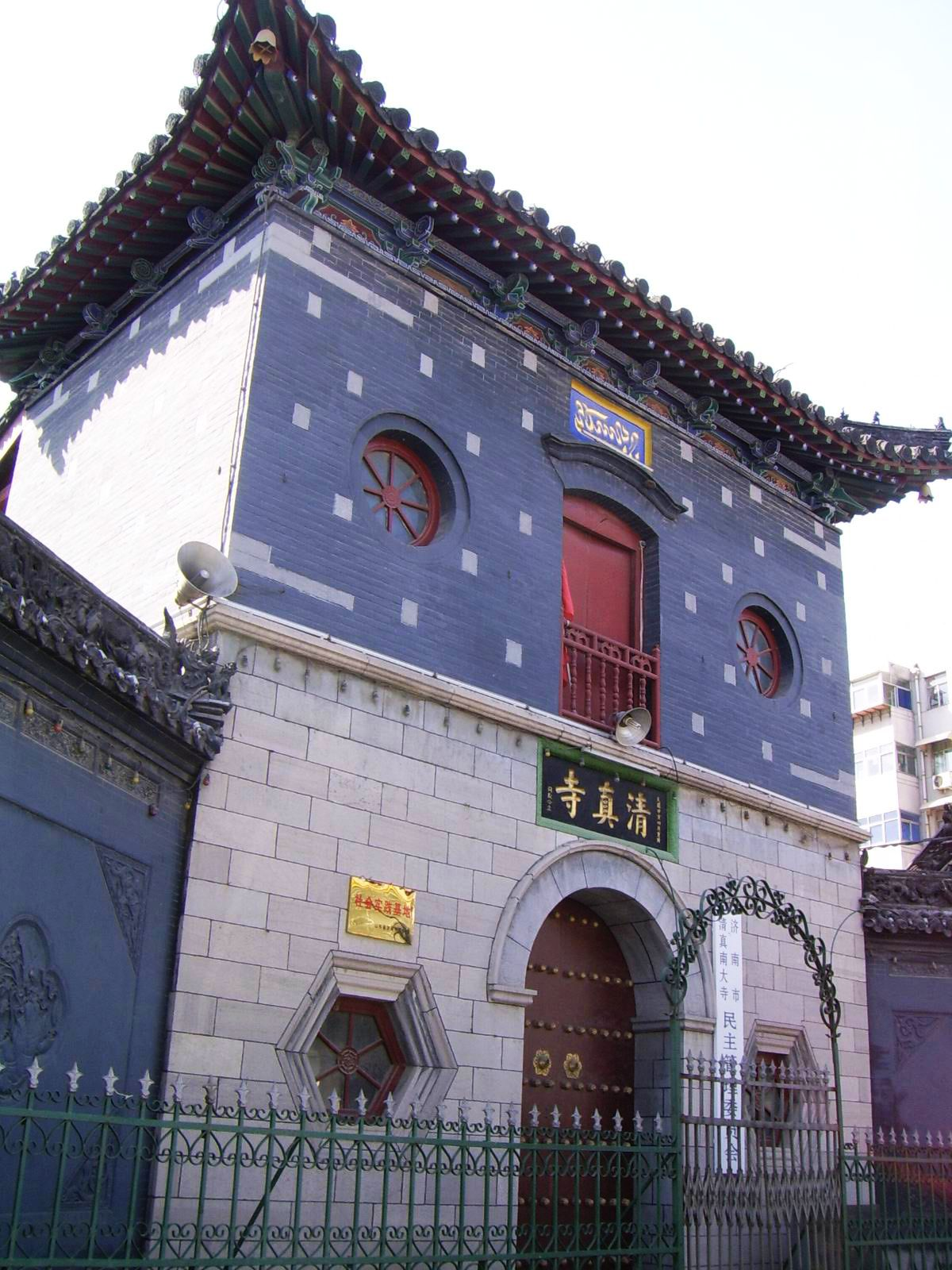
Jinan Great Southern Mosque

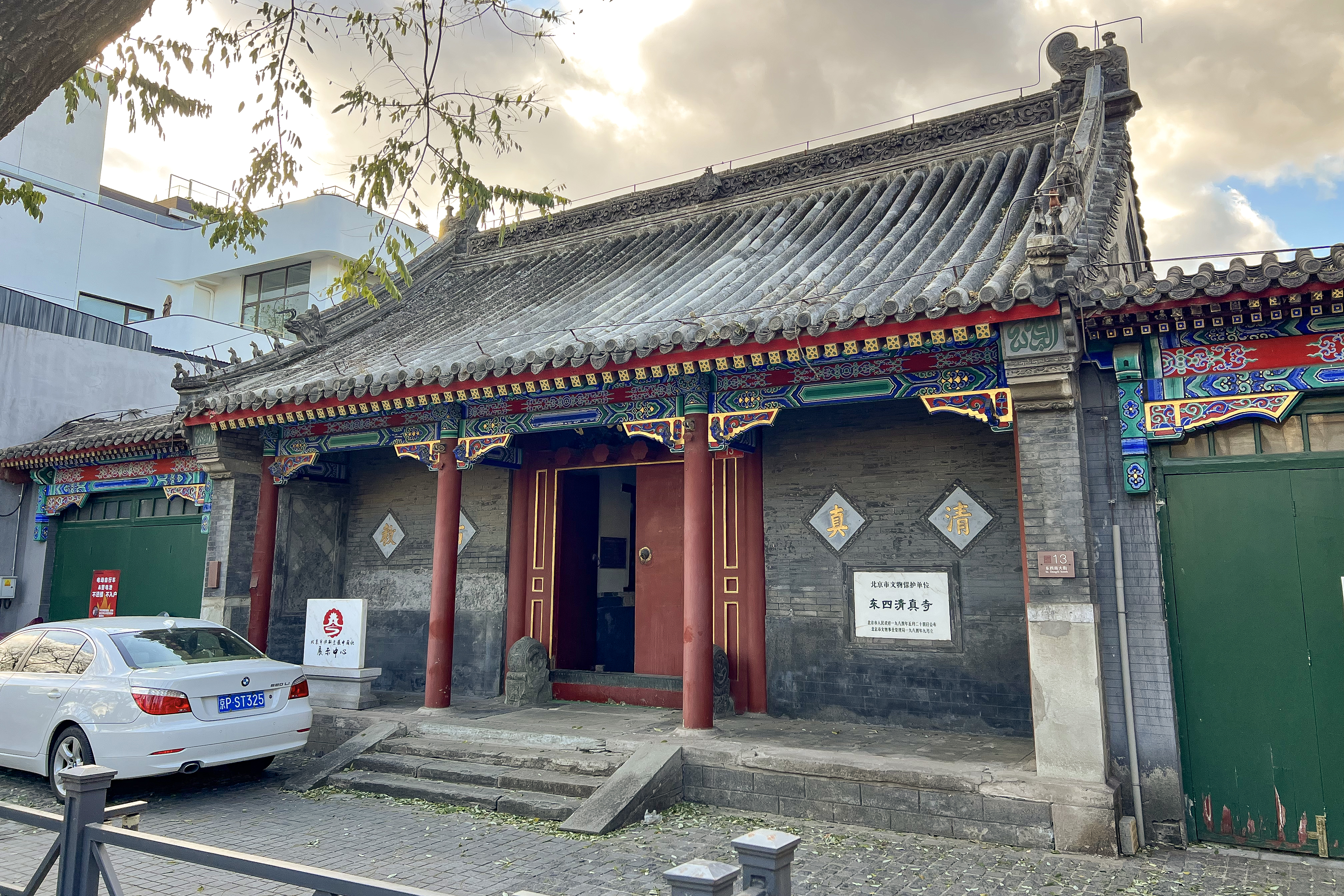
Dongsi Mosque in Beijing

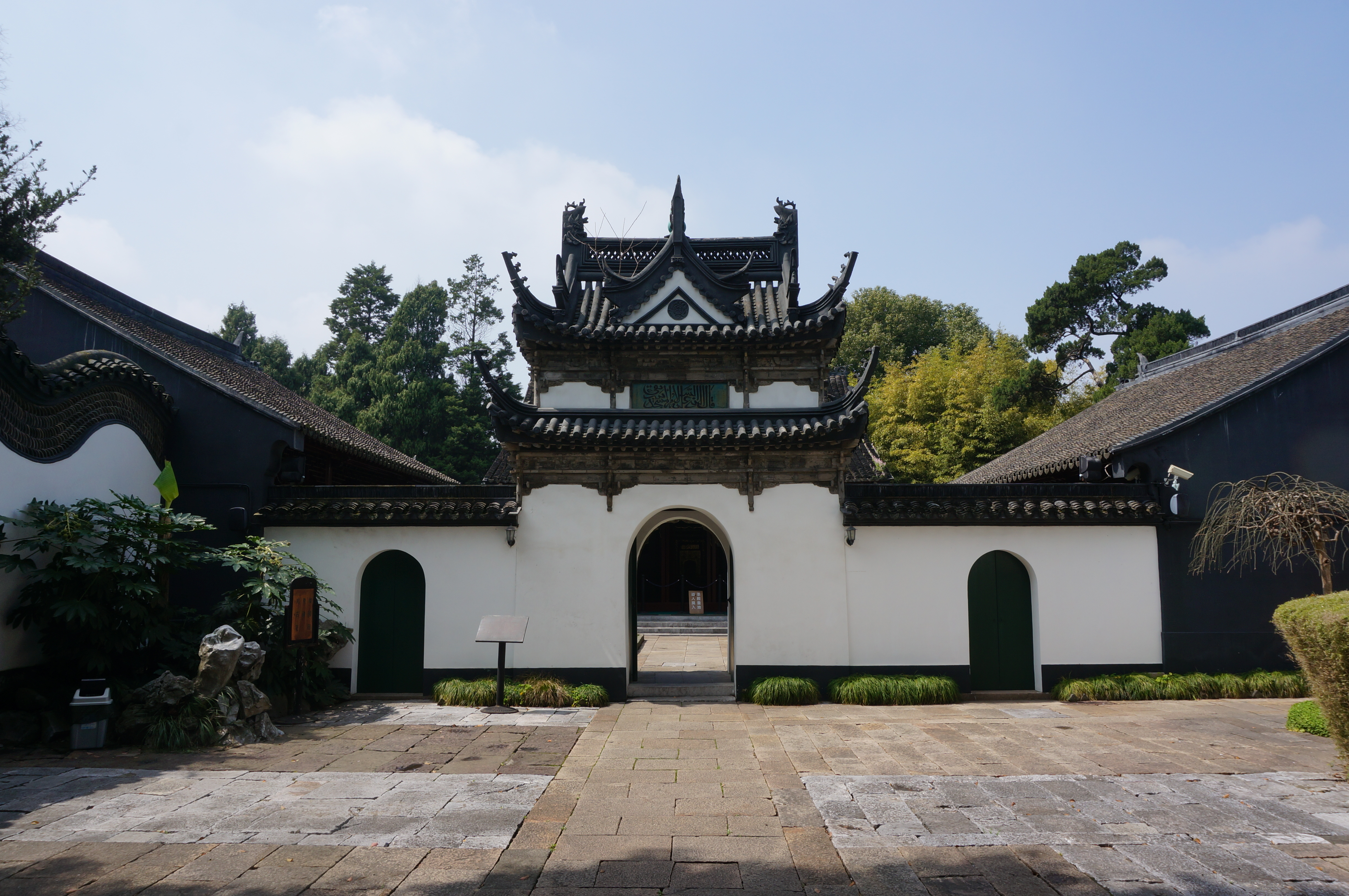
Songjiang Mosque

== Ming and Qing dynasties ==
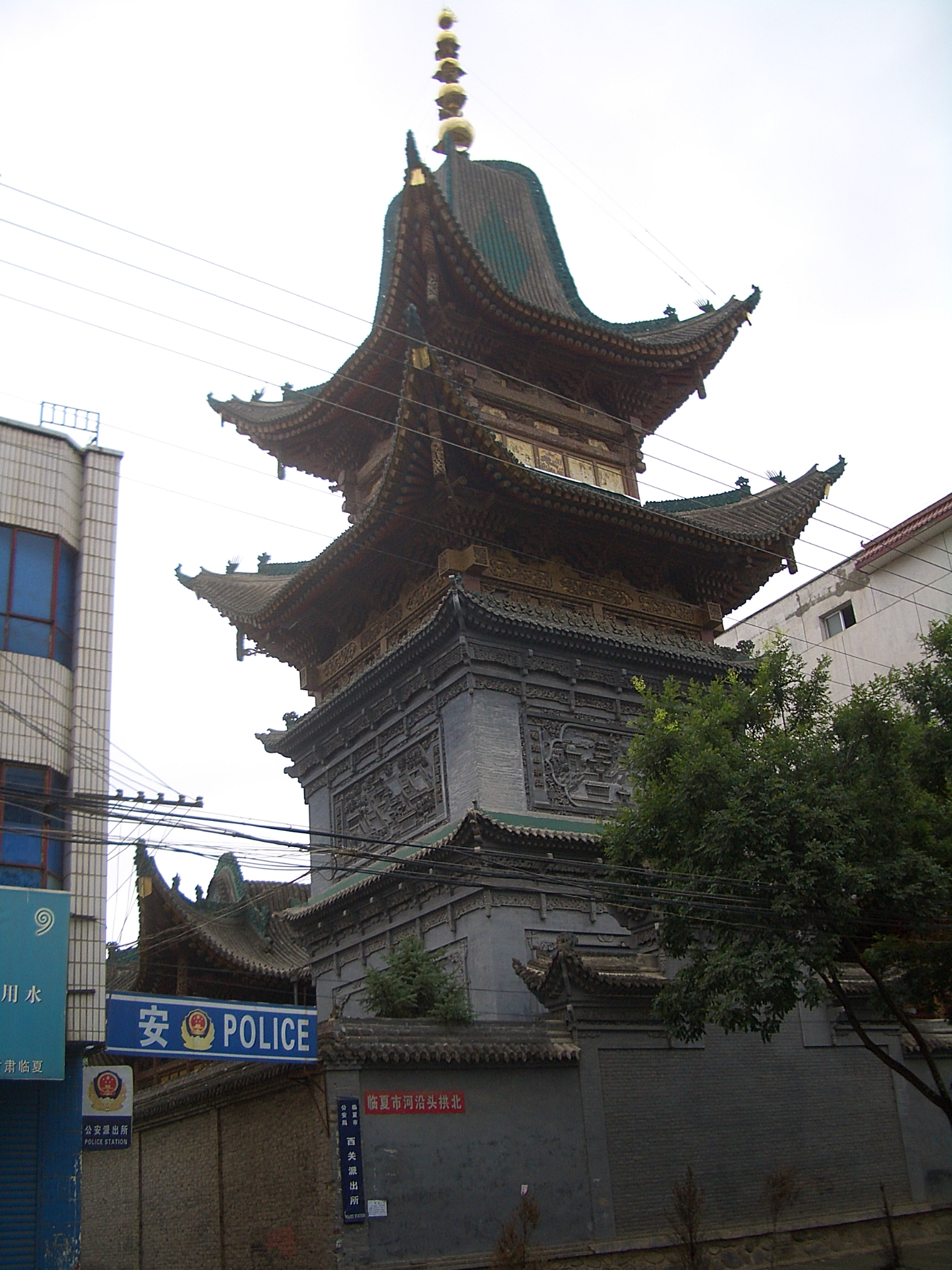
A gongbei in Linxia City

In the early Ming period, an increasing amount of mosques and other Islamic institutions adopted strongly Chinese styles of architecture. The additions of pagodas to mosques and their distribution between regular homes made them blend well within the Chinese environment. Tablets and other monuments on mosques written in Chinese became the norm during this period as well. Later in the Ming dynasty, construction of lecture halls within mosques began in Shaanxi and later spread throughout China. The late Ming and early Qing period saw a rapid growth of construction of mosques.

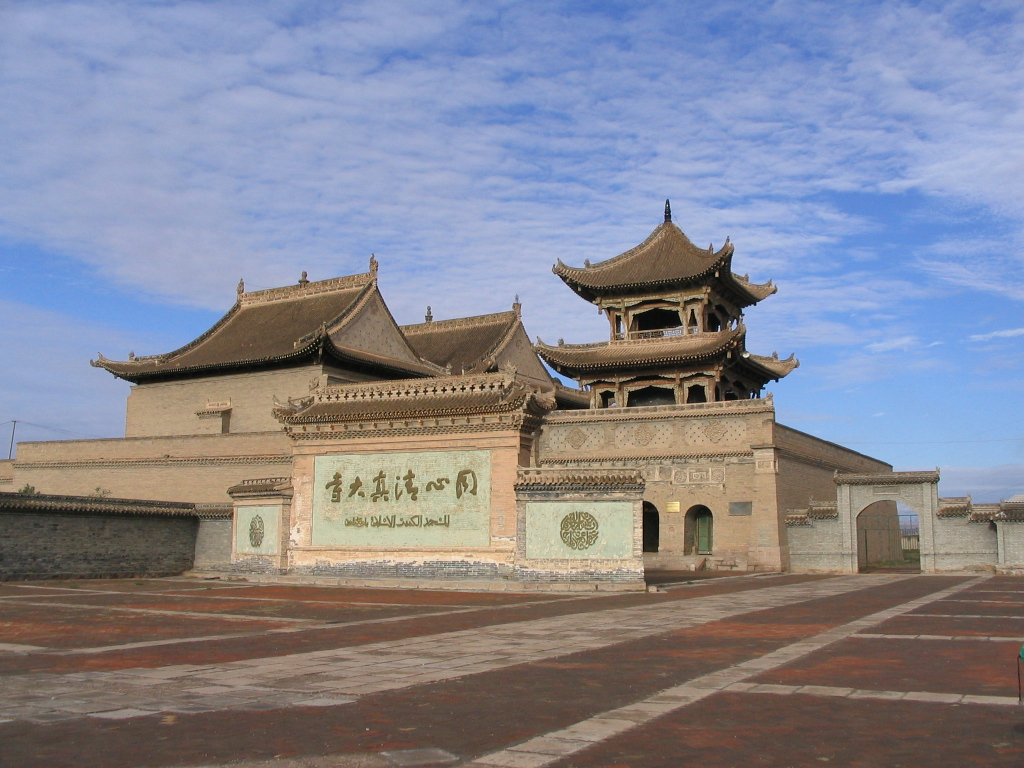
Tongxin Great Mosque established in the 14th century (Yuan dynasty) but reconsecrated as a mosque during the early Ming dynasty.

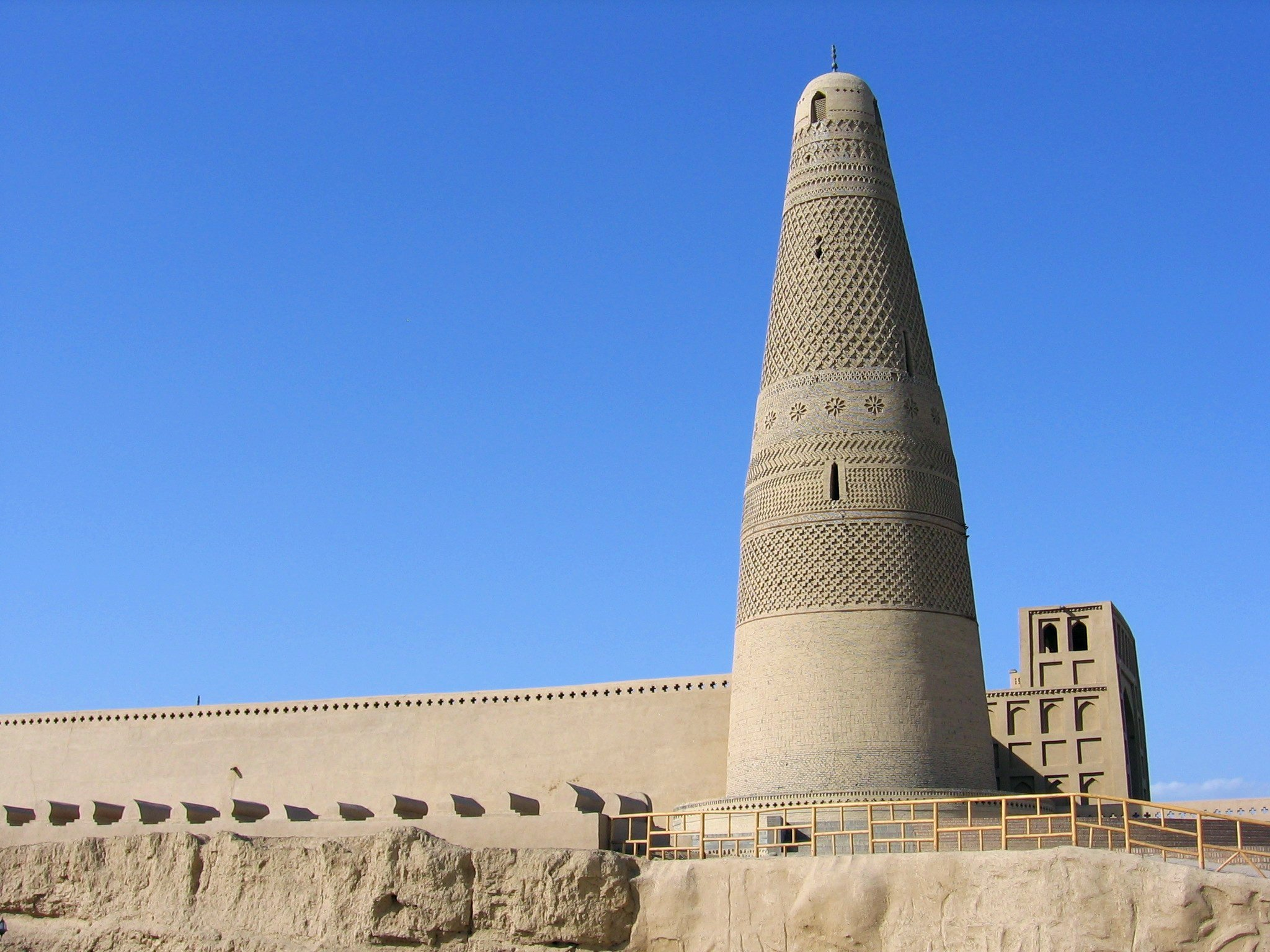
Emin Minaret Mosque exhibiting Central Asian architecture

== Modern times ==
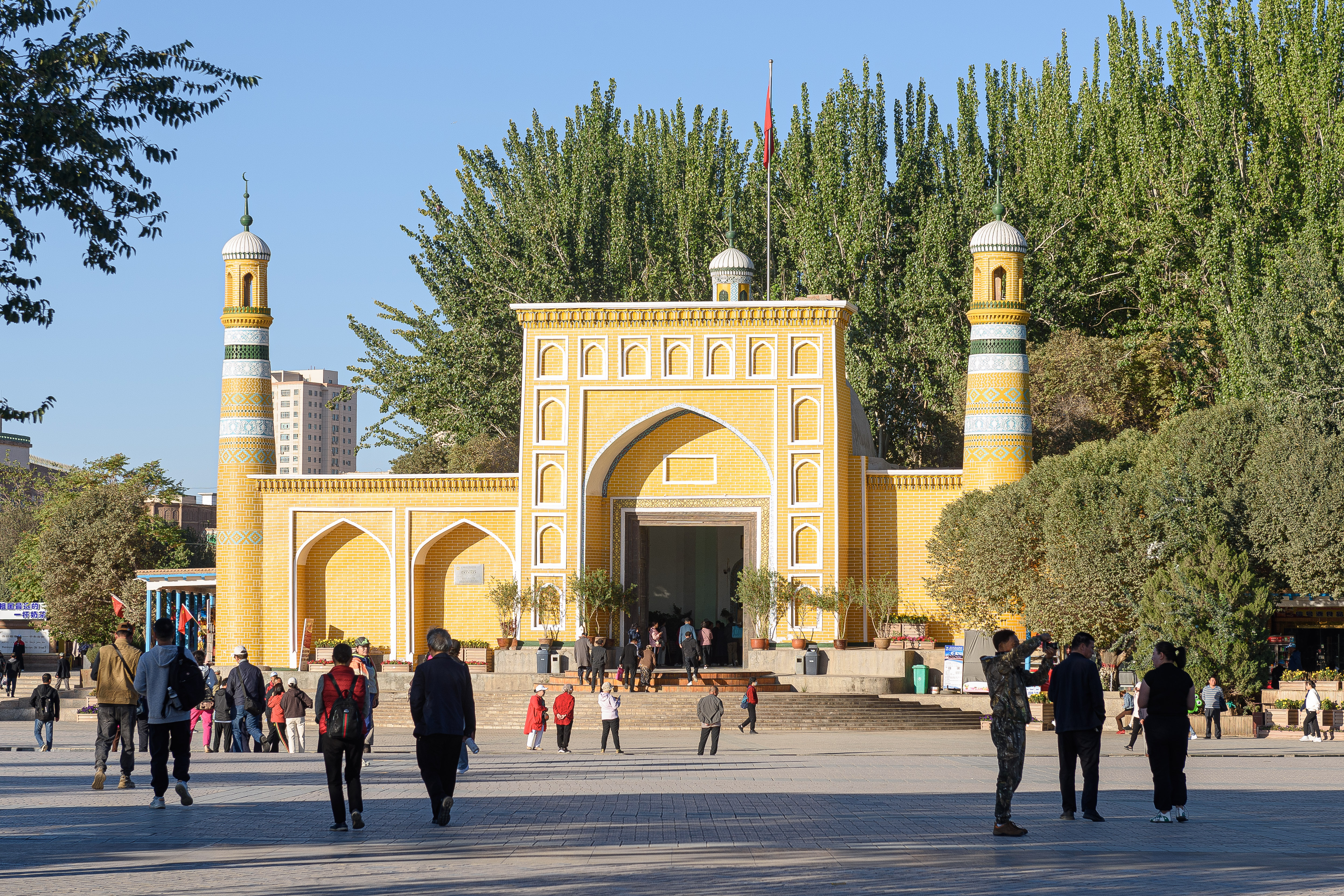
Id Kah Mosque in Kashgar dating back to 1442 CE has Central Asian architecture

After 1945 and until the 1980s, Islam was tightly controlled by the state. During the Cultural Revolution a large number of mosques and religious structures were destroyed or damaged. Serious strife occurred such as the Shadian incident in 1975. The opening instituted under Deng Xiaoping relaxed the controls. Traditional Islamic architectural influences started coming in stronger, with many rebuilt and renovated mosques having Islamic-style domes and minarets. The Grand Mosque of Shadian was constructed with a design inspired from the Middle East.

Starting in 2018 the government instituted a sinicization policy "to guide Islam to be compatible with socialism and implement measures to sinicise the religion". The campaign is also called the three sanhua (三化), or "the three -izations", to implement "de-Arabization", "de-Saudization" and "de-halalization". This included removing domes and minarets. This policy has led to public unrest such as in August 2018 at the Weizhou Grand Mosque in Ningxia and in June 2023 in Najiaying, Yunnan. The Great Mosque of Shadian was also renovated to remove the dome and remodel the minaret with Chinese traditional architecture.

== See also ==
- Gongbei (Islamic architecture)
- List of mosques in China
- Menhuan
