= Chinese Islamic art =

Chinese Islamic art describes the shared artistic and cultural history between Chinese and Muslim populations. Initially shaped by gradual exchange through trade, Islamic artistic influences in China became more pronounced during the Yuan dynasty, when cultural assimilation was accelerated under Mongol rule.

== Background ==
Islam first entered China in the 7th century during the Tang dynasty through trade routes and maritime routes with many communities composing of Arab, Persian, and Central Asian merchants who would assimilate and produce the earliest known Mosques in China.

Amidst Genghis Khan's conquests, he was known to spare the artisans and educated, many of whom were Muslim and would employ them in certain positions of power such as ministers, generals, doctors, and astronomers.

The Yuan Dynasty was the strongest focus for cultural synthesis between Chinese and Islamic art. Mongol rule protects trade routes, strengthening security along what would become known as the Silk Road, while also greatly promoting such cultural synthesis. maritime trade expanded and Arab merchants had a flourishing colony in Guangzhou. Kublai Khan, ruler of the Yuan Dynasty was a patron of the arts, and centralized centralizes workshops in China.

== Glass ==
Archaeological discoveries and stylistic analysis reveal significant Islamic influence on Chinese glass and ceramics from the Tang to the Qing dynasties. Islamic produced glass objects in Fa Men Temple were excavated in 1987 showing strong signs of Islamic contact with China during the Tang Dynasty. The Chinese adopted mallet-shaped Ju ware (Ru Kiln) during 11th and 12th century showed strong influence from Iranian and Egyptian glassware of the 9th century. Scholars have also suggested that the exchange of glassmaking techniques between the Middle East and China contributed to advancements in both regions' decorative styles.

In the Islamic regions of Iran and Mesopotamia, flat and concave patterns found in stoneware and glass were famously created using a lapidary facet cutting technique that appears to have been adopted by the Chinese. Such technique was found to parallel Chinese glass water containers of Kangxi period albeit Xue notes that "there is no direct record to prove the influence of Islamic facet-cut decoration on Chinese glass practice during the Kangxi period.."

Islamic inscriptions on Chinese ceramics dating back to the Tang Dynasty, applied purely for export purposes (to Islamic nations). In the Qing dynasty, Arabic inscriptions began to be applied on glassware in the imperial workshop. Bushell notes (like many other Chinese Islamic works) that many of the Arabic inscriptions were noted to be of subpar quality, with some words being illegible; Xue postulates that the Chinese artisans may not have understood Arabic, but were simply copying patterns they had seen.

== Porcelain ==
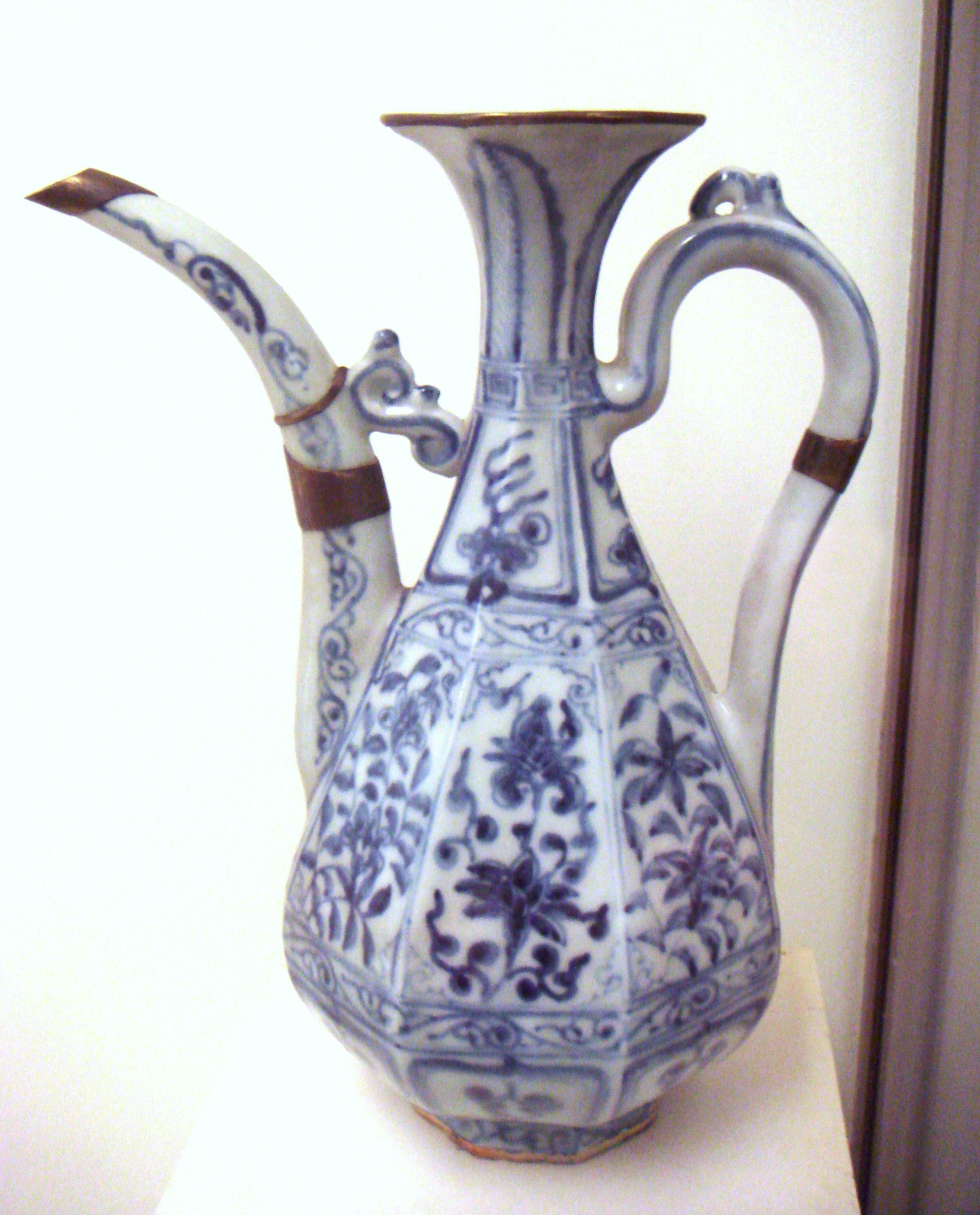
Early Chinese blue and white porcelain, c. 1335, in the Yuan dynasty; Jingdezhen ware.

The first instance of the white blue porcelain was postulated to originate in Mesopotamia (modern day Iraq) occurring around the 7-8th century, (late Tang dynasty) created by the potters in Basra. At the same time, during the late Tang dynasty in China, kilns such as those at Gongxian in Henan province began experimenting with cobalt blue decoration on high-fired white stoneware. These early Chinese blue-and-white wares were primarily produced for export and featured motifs influenced by West Asian designs, including lozenge and palmette patterns. Unfortunately, these blue white porcelain designs were short-lived and not widely adopted domestically, these Tang-era.

The blue white designs would be revived during the Yuan Dynasty under Mongol rule. Jingdezhen was a city in the southeast Jiangxi province in China that produces the porcelain and excellent ceramics throughout Tang Dynasty due to abundant resource of kaolin, a clay material essential to manufacturing porcelain. Islamic inscriptions as main motif was a popular design created by Chinese Muslims that were exported as gifts to rulers of Islamic countries, eventually passing to hands of provincial potters who catered to common people in China and Basars.

The very blue color famed on Chinese porcelain has origins deeply connected to Islam. Jingdezhen potters used "underglaze blue" as a color that was derived from cobalt. Adaptation of process was developed earlier in Mesopotamia. Some claims cobalt was imported from Persia; specific existence of trade routes between China and Iran where cobalt blue was traded as "Islamic blue" or Huihui qing but reportedly had varying results of efficacy.

== Silk textiles ==
Silk textiles have a long history between Islamic nations and China. The earliest dating of silk textiles was roughly 5000 years ago discovered in a Qingtai, which would find its way into Islamic nations through trade. In the 6th century, Sassanid Persian cities would begin developing silk textiles of their own, additionally using the drawlooms developed by China

Under Mongol Yuan Dynasty, artisans of different backgrounds would be transported over long distances to workshops, working side by side alongside other artisans of numerous backgrounds. Silk textiles were heavily favored to the Mongols as court garments, religious purposes, diplomatic gifts, or simply a sign of luxury. One of the more luxurious silk textiles was the nasij al-dhahab al-harir (shortened to Nasij), the name directly translating to 'cloth of gold and silver' was a type of silk textile characterized by its golden silk design was highly favored even by Genghis Khan. Mao writes that "Nasij was described as the most luxurious fabric, what both pattern and background were woven in differing types of gold thread, it was gold-on-gold textiles, as well as a kind of cloth with overall patterns woven in gold."

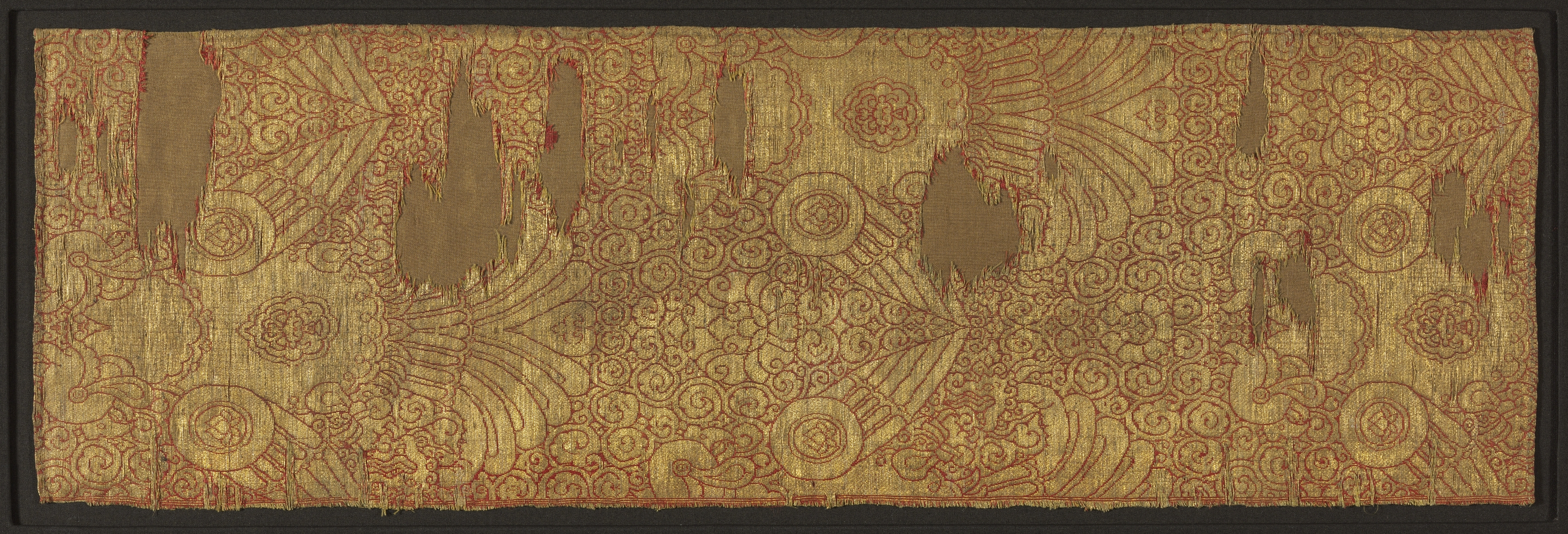
Lampas, silk and gold thread; textile used in the making of jisün, 1240.

see more on golden textiles: Chinese ornamental gold silk

== Calligraphy ==
The blend of Chinese Islamic calligraphy first merged in the Yuan Dynasty. Many Muslims migrated to China during Mongol rule. To express Islamic cultural identity, the Sini script was employed in religious contexts including mosques, tombstones, and manuscripts containing Qur'anic verses. Characterized by its elegant, flowing lines and brush-like strokes influenced by traditional Chinese calligraphy, Sini represents a profound synthesis of Islamic and Chinese aesthetic traditions. By name, Sini is a broad spectrum of Chinese Islamic calligraphy, but it was standardized during the Ming Dynasty "characterized by its round, flowing letters and tapered strokes reminiscent of Chinese brush calligraphy, Sini script utilized thick horizontal and fine vertical lines, a stylistic choice influenced by the use of a brush rather than the traditional reed pen (qalam)."

== See also ==
- Chinese Islamic architecture
- Islam in China
- Islam in China (1912–present)
- Chinese Islamic cuisine
- Yuan dynasty
