= Grand Mosque of Shadian =

Mosque in Yunnan, China

- 沙甸大清真寺
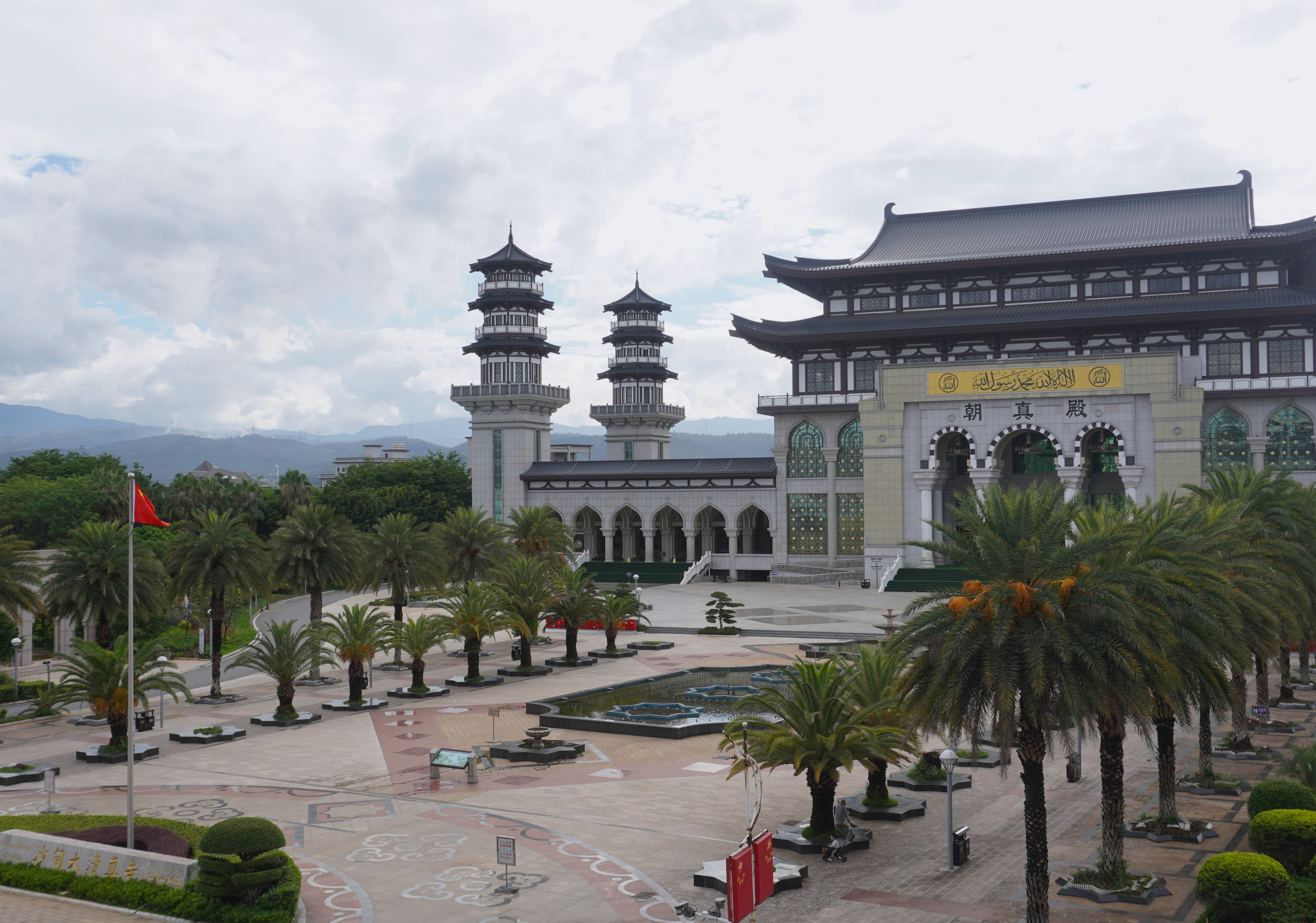
- The mosque in 2025

- Location of the mosque in Yunnan

Religion
- Affiliation: Sunni Islam
- Ecclesiastical or organizational status: Mosque
- Status: Active

Location
- Location: Shadian, Gejiu, Yunnan
- Country: China
- Interactive map of Grand Mosque of Shadian
- Coordinates: 23°31′53″N 103°13′47″E

Architecture
- Type: Mosque
- Style: Islamic (original); Chinese (since 2023)
- Completed: 1684 CE

Specifications
- Interior area: 21,000 m^{2} (230,000 sq ft)
- Dome: 5 (removed in 2023)
- Minaret: 4 (removed in 2023)
- Materials: Bricks; tiles

Chinese name
- Simplified Chinese: 沙甸大清真寺
Transcriptions

The Grand Mosque of Shadian (Chinese: 沙甸大清真寺: Arabic: جامع شاديان) is a mosque located in the Shadian suburb of Gejiu City, in the Yunnan province of China.

== Overview ==
Originally built in 1684 CE, the 21,000-square-metre (230,000 sq ft) complex featured a tiled green central dome with a crescent moon, four smaller domes, and soaring minarets, with features from Nabawi Mosque in Medina, Saudi Arabia. It was the last major mosque in China built in the Islamic style until its domes were removed in 2023.

The demolition of the domes and minarets took place one month after clashes in the nearby Nagu township. The restyling of the mosque aligned with the 2018 policy of "Sinification of Islam". In 2024, the Xinjiang Uygur Autonomous Region's top official said that, "everyone knows that Islam in Xinjiang needs to be Sinicised, this is an inevitable trend," and similar measures can be seen across China.

== Gallery ==
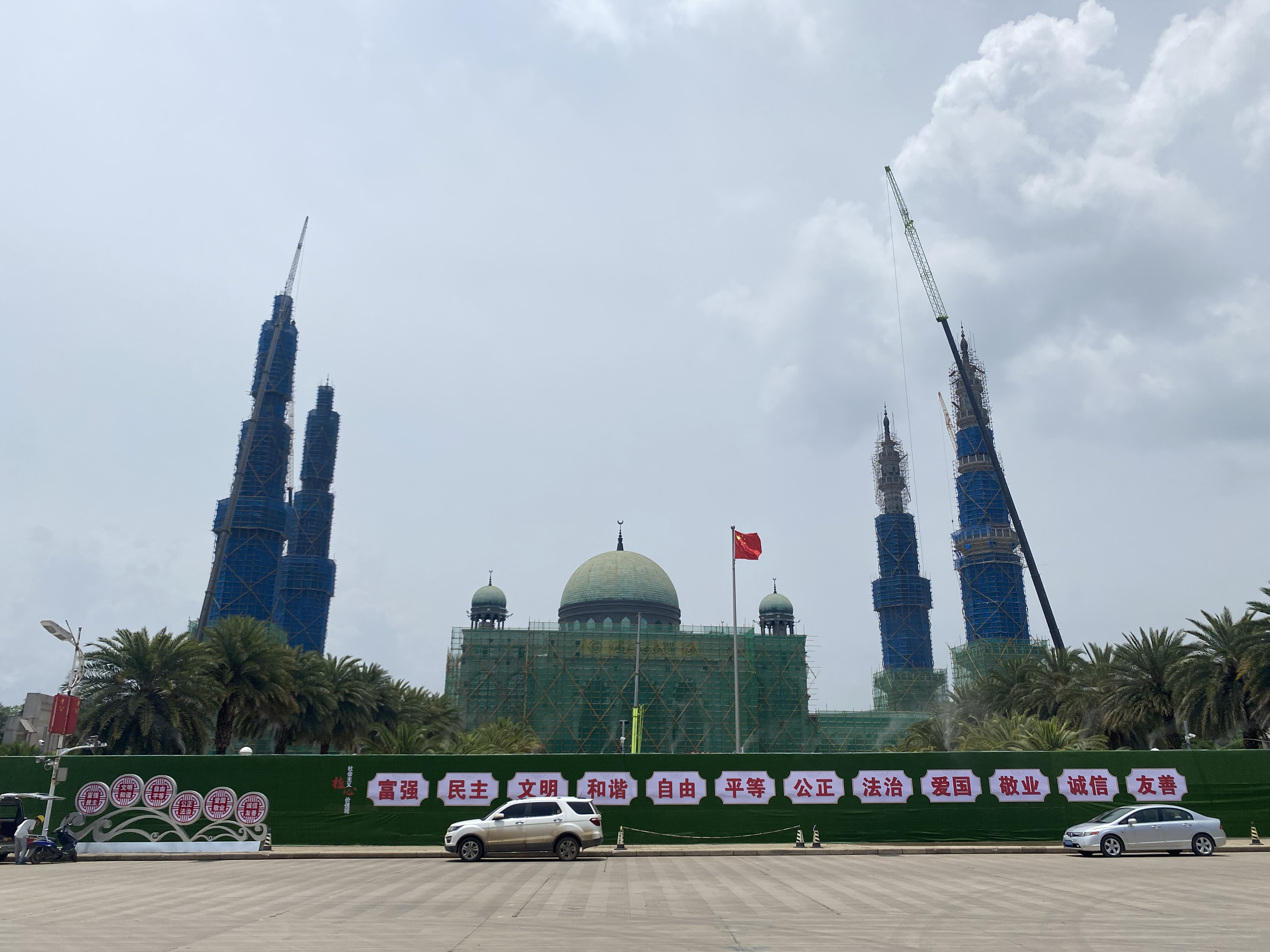
The mosque in 2023, as its domes and minarets were removed

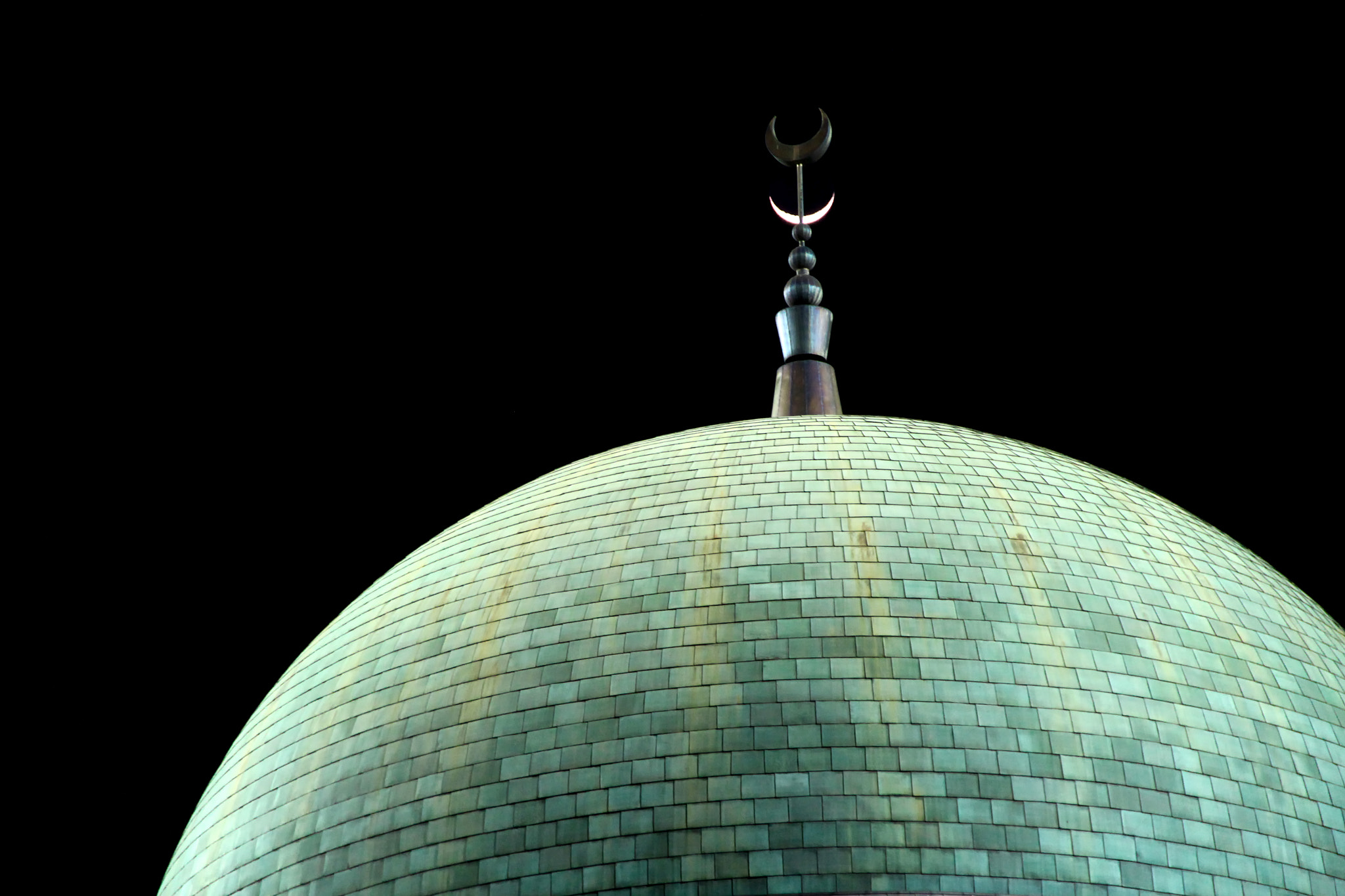
Detail of the mosque's former central dome

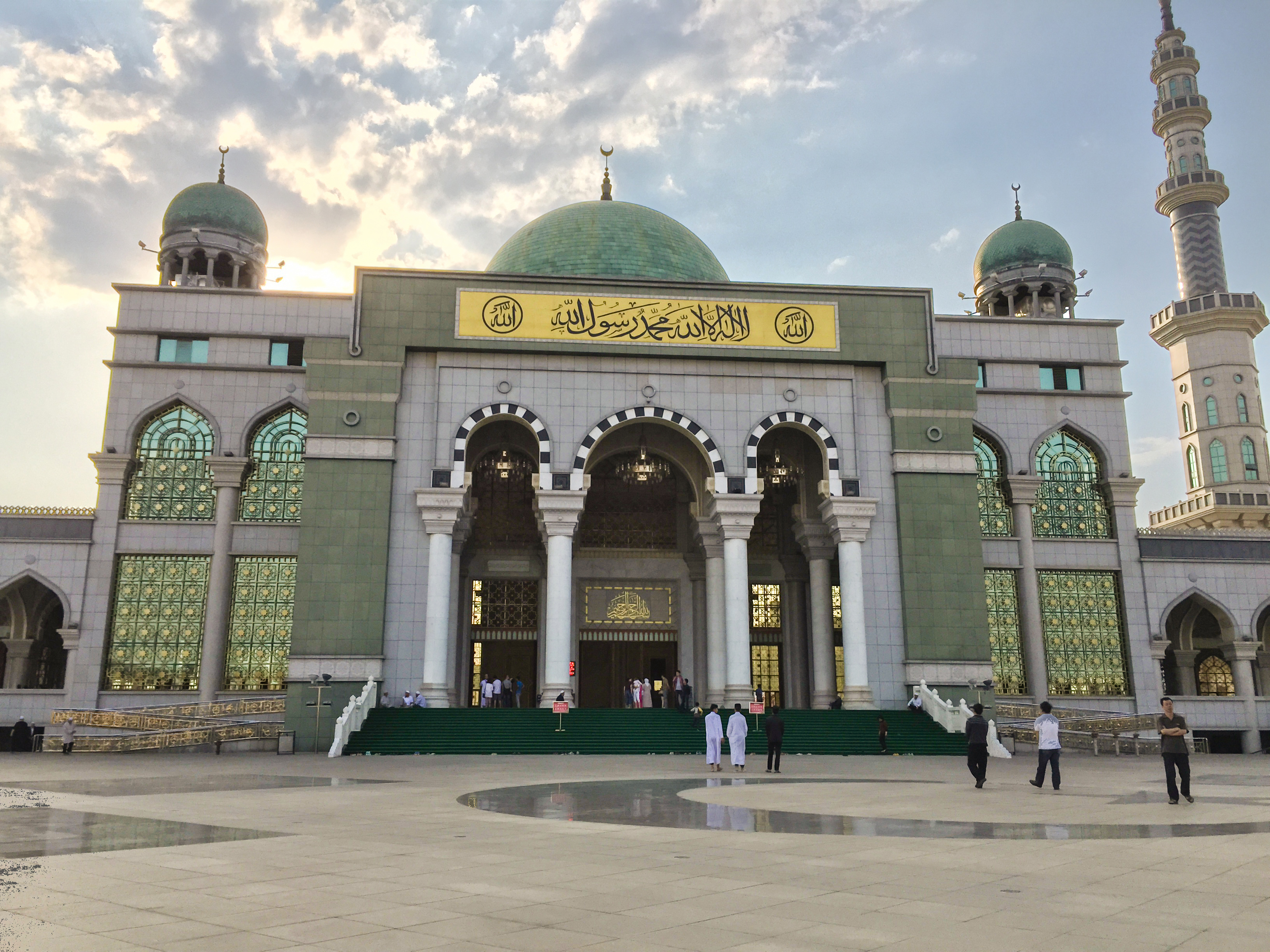
The mosque prior to removal of the domes and minarets

== See also ==
- Islam in China
- List of mosques in China
- Shadian incident
- Islamophobia in China
