= Islamophobia in China =

Muslims in China have sometimes faces negative views and attitudes, and some Muslim communities in face legal restrictions on their ability to practice. Anti-Muslim attitudes in China have been tied to both narratives regarding historical conflicts between China and Muslim polities as well as contemporary rhetoric related to terrorism in China and abroad.

In the 21st century, coverage of Muslims in Chinese media has generally been negative, and Islamophobic content has increased on Chinese social media. In Xinjiang, former Muslim detainees in mass detention centers and re-education camps in the 2010s have reported facing anti-Muslim practices such as being force-fed pork.

== History ==
Recent scholars contend that historical conflicts between the Han Chinese and Muslims like the Dungan Revolt against the Qing dynasty have been used by some Han Chinese to legitimize and fuel anti-Muslim beliefs and bias in contemporary China. Following the establishment of the People's Republic of China in 1949, ten ethnic groups that were traditionally Muslim eventually were designated as part of the state's recognized ethnicities. According to Emily Feng, state-sanctioned ethnic distinctions for traditionally Muslim groups created a "buffer against proselytization and the further spread of Islam in China." Scholars and researchers have also argued that Western Islamophobia and the "war on terror" have contributed to the mainstreaming of anti-Muslim sentiments and practices in China.

In 1975, Hui Muslims protested against being "compelled…to eat pork" and incidents of "pork bones…thrown into wells" to "irretrievably pollute the drinking water," which preceded the Shadian incident. It has been reported that Muslims were being forced to eat pork in detention centers and in the Xinjiang re-education camps. Since Xi Jinping became General Secretary of the Chinese Communist Party, campaigns against Islam have extended to the Hui people and Utsul community in Hainan. In 2017, the Chinese government officially prohibited Muslims in Xinjiang from naming their babies "Muhammad" among other Islamic names. In 2023, NPR reported on ways that the Chinese government is actively preventing Chinese Muslim from going on the Hajj such as confiscation of passports. In Uyghur communities, Islamic education for children has been prohibited and teaching the Quran to children has resulted in criminal prosecution. In 2023, government efforts to "sinicize" a mosque in Yunnan by destroying its minaret and dome roof led to clashes with worshippers.

China supports United Nations programs to combat Islamophobia. China highlights its contributions to these UN endeavors in its diplomatic discourse opposing the Clash of Civilizations thesis.

=== News coverage ===
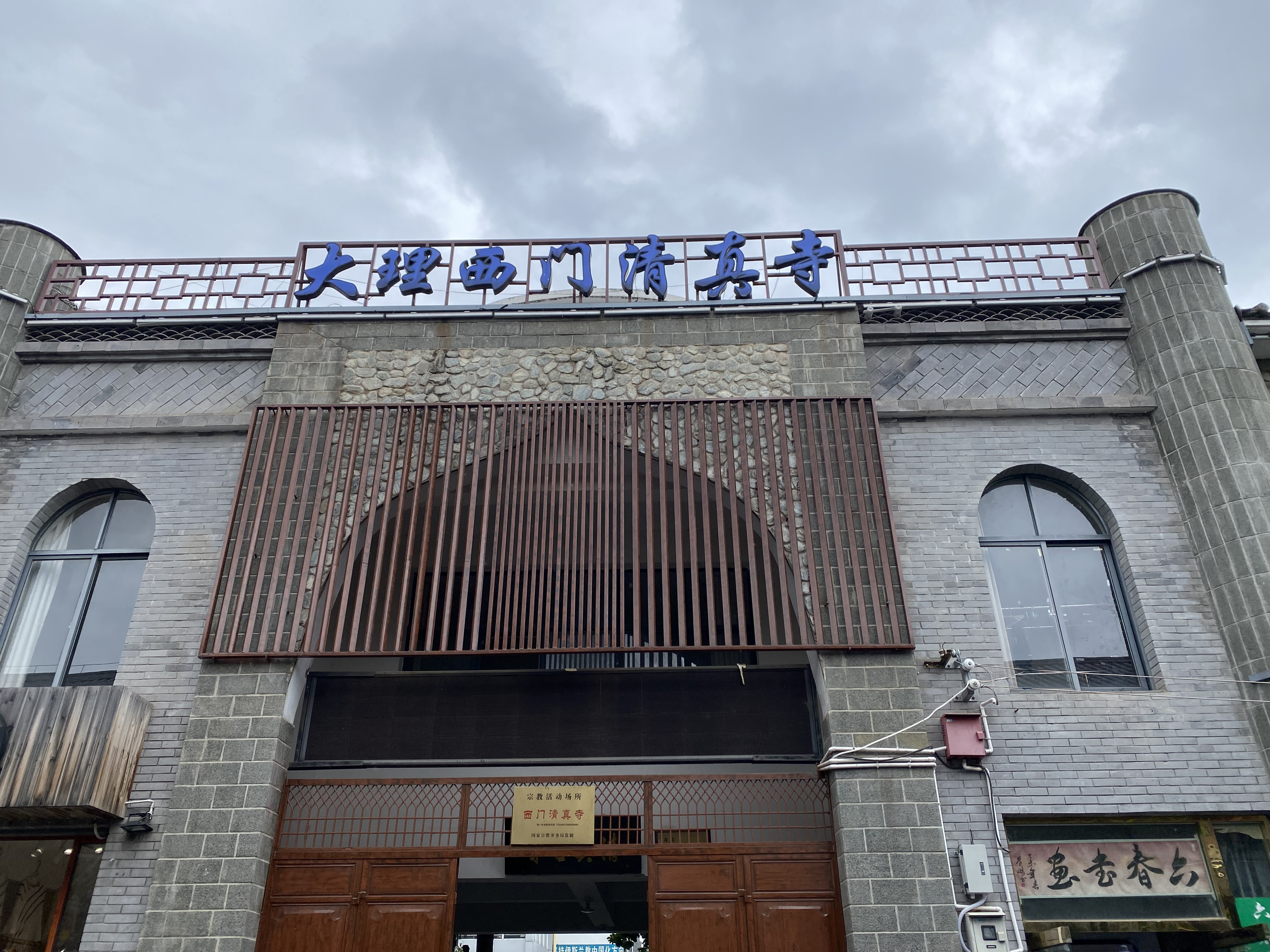
Mosque with dome removed due to Sinicization policy

Traditional media in China were used to be very cautious on the coverage of ethnic issues—particularly Muslim issues, to foster a positive environment both for solidarity among China's different ethnic groups and religions and China's diplomatic relations with Muslim countries. Starting in 2015, hostility towards Muslims and Islam surged after series of terrorist attacks and the emergence of the European refugee crisis. Some observers contend that although negative stereotypes about Muslims have long existed in China, a global rise of Islamophobia, the influence of fake news, and the actions of the Chinese government towards their Muslim minorities have exacerbated Islamophobia in the country.

US-based researchers Rose Luqiu and Fan Yang contend in The Washington Post that anti-Muslim sentiment has been spurred by Chinese news reports, which tend to portray Muslims as prone to terrorism, or as recipients of disproportionate aid from the government. A 2018 study by the two researchers found that Chinese news coverage of Muslims and Islam was generally negative. The study found that non-Muslim Chinese hold negative views towards Islam and Muslims, and that some Chinese Muslims report discrimination and awareness of negative portrayals of themselves in the media.

=== Online ===
The same two researchers analyzed over 10,000 posts on Weibo in 2019 relating to Islam and found that anti-Muslim sentiment was a common frame. Chinese Muslims users on the site reported that they faced challenges in attempting to have others understand their faith, due to the prevailing Han-centric discourse and government censorship.

In 2017, Gerry Shih of the Associated Press described Islamophobic rhetoric in online social media posts as due to perceived injustices regarding the Muslim minority advantages in college admissions and exemptions from family-size limits. In 2018, a South China Morning Post article similarly described online Islamophobia in China as "becoming increasingly widespread" particularly due to news of institutional preferential treatment for Muslim minorities and news of Xinjiang conflict. A 2018 University of California, San Diego study of 77,642 posts from Tencent QQ suggested that online Islamophobia was especially concentrated in provinces with higher Muslim populations. An online movement against the spread of halal products in the country has also been reported.

According to Tony Lin of the Columbia Journalism Review, many users utilize popular sites like Weibo and WeChat to spread anti-Muslim fake news taken from western far-right media. He wrote that after the 2019 Christchurch mosque shootings, the most liked comments under Chinese social media posts and various mainstream media sites covering the incident were explicitly anti-Muslim or in support of the shooter. However, he also wrote that the comments were not representative of the Chinese population. Other articles have reported on the more varied netizen responses to the mosque shootings.

== See also ==
- History of Islam in China
- Islam in China (1912–present)
- History of Xinjiang
- Xinjiang conflict
- Xinjiang re-education camps
- Persecution of Uyghurs in China
- Shadian incident
