= Najiaying Mosque =

Mosque in Yunnan, China

- 纳家营清真寺
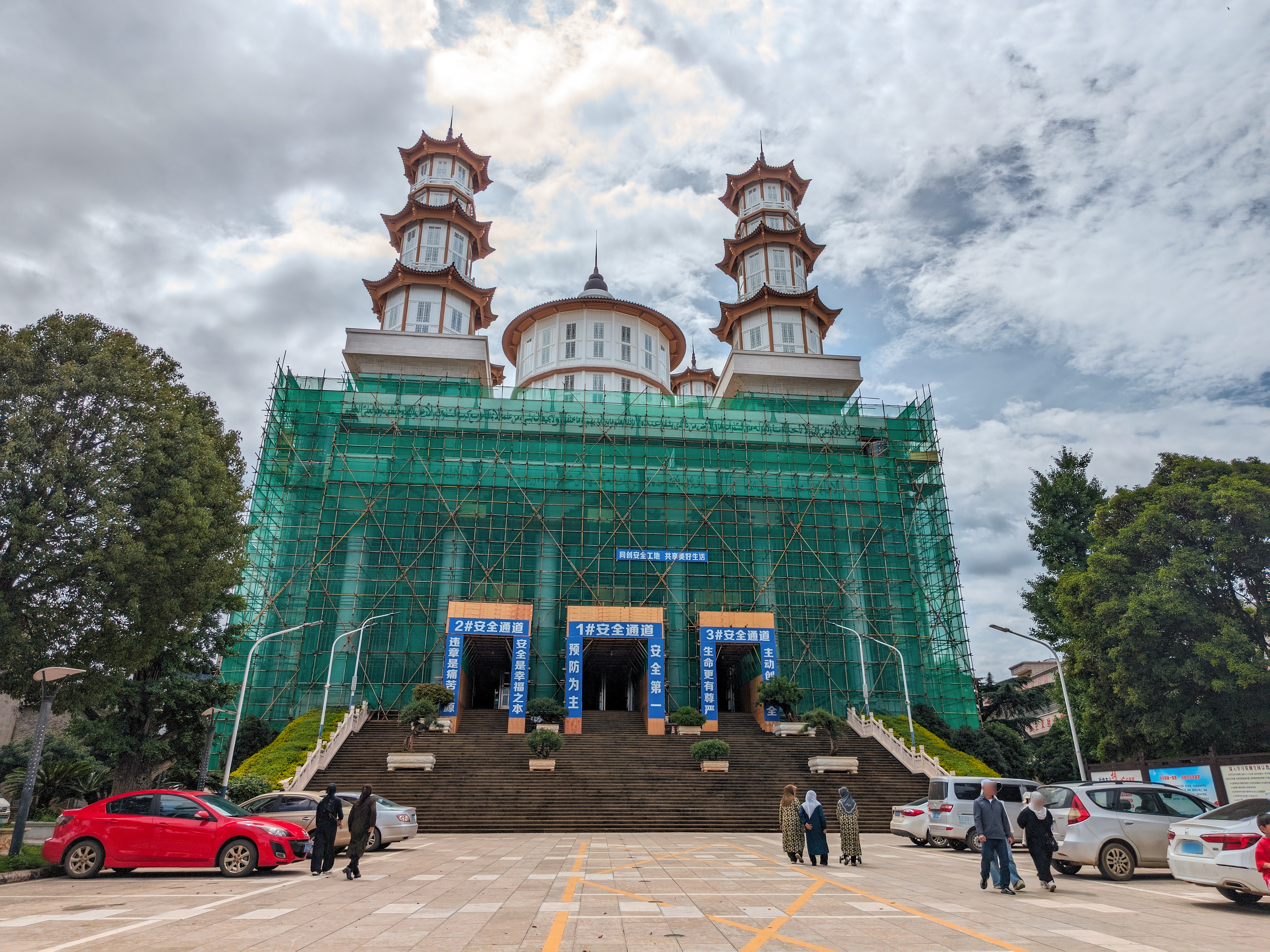
- Mosque under renovation (August 2025)

- Location of the mosque in Yunnan

Religion
- Affiliation: Sunni Islam
- Ecclesiastical or organizational status: Mosque
- Status: Active

Location
- Location: Tonghai, Yuxi, Yunnan
- Country: China
- Interactive map of Najiaying Mosque
- Coordinates: 24°10′52″N 102°44′03″E

Architecture
- Type: Mosque
- Completed: 1370 CE (original); 2004 (current)

Specifications
- Capacity: 3,000 worshipers (current); 800 worshipers (original)
- Interior area: 10,000 m^{2} (110,000 sq ft)
- Dome: 1
- Minaret: 4
- Minaret height: 72.4 m (238 ft)

Chinese name
- Simplified Chinese: 纳家营清真寺
- Traditional Chinese: 納家營清真寺
- Xiao'erjing: مسجد ناجياينغ
Transcriptions
Standard Mandarin
- Hanyu Pinyin: Nàjiāyíng Qīngzhēnsì
other Mandarin
- Xiao'erjing: مسجد ناجياينغ

The Najiaying Mosque (Chinese: 纳家营清真寺; pinyin: Nàjiāyíng Qīngzhēnsì; Xiao'erjing: مسجد ناجياينغ) is a mosque in Tonghai County, Yuxi City, in the Yunnan province of China.

== History ==
The mosque was built in 1370 CE and has expanded several times since. A new mosque was constructed in 2004. In 2019, part of the mosque was listed as a protected cultural relic. In May 2023, locals clashed with police as they attempted to stop the authorities' demolition of the mosque's domed roof.

== Architecture ==
The new mosque building consists of five floors, four minarets and a dome. The hall occupies an area of 10,000 square metres (110,000 sq ft) and the minarets are 72.4 metres (238 ft) high. The second floor can accommodate 3,000 worshipers. The old building used a traditional Chinese architectural style, and has subsequently been used as a mosque for women that can hold up to 800 worshipers.

== Gallery ==
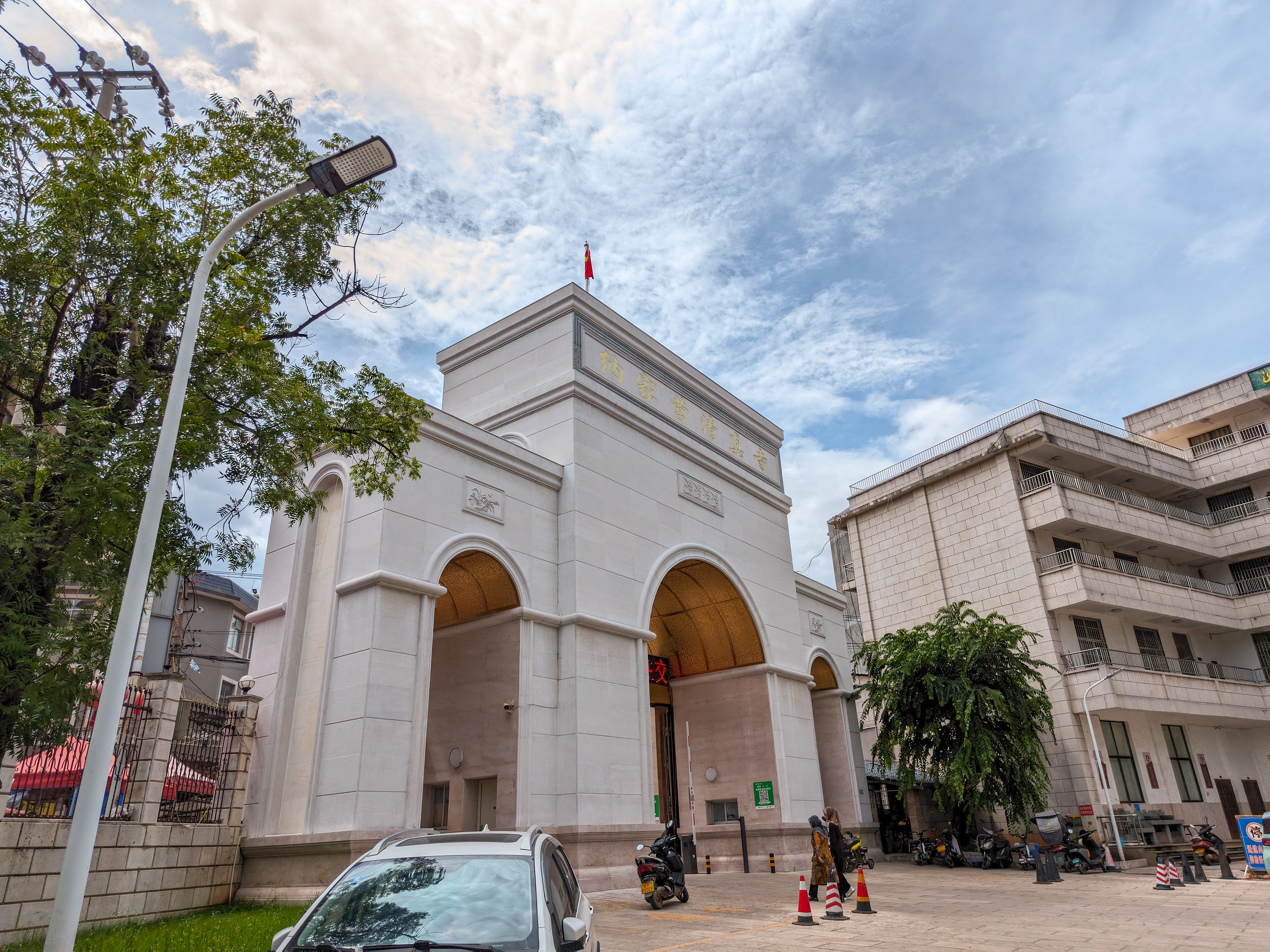
The main iwan in 2025

== See also ==
- Islam in China
- List of mosques in China
