= Taiyuan Ancient Mosque =

Mosque in Taiyuan, Shanxi, China

- 太原清真古寺
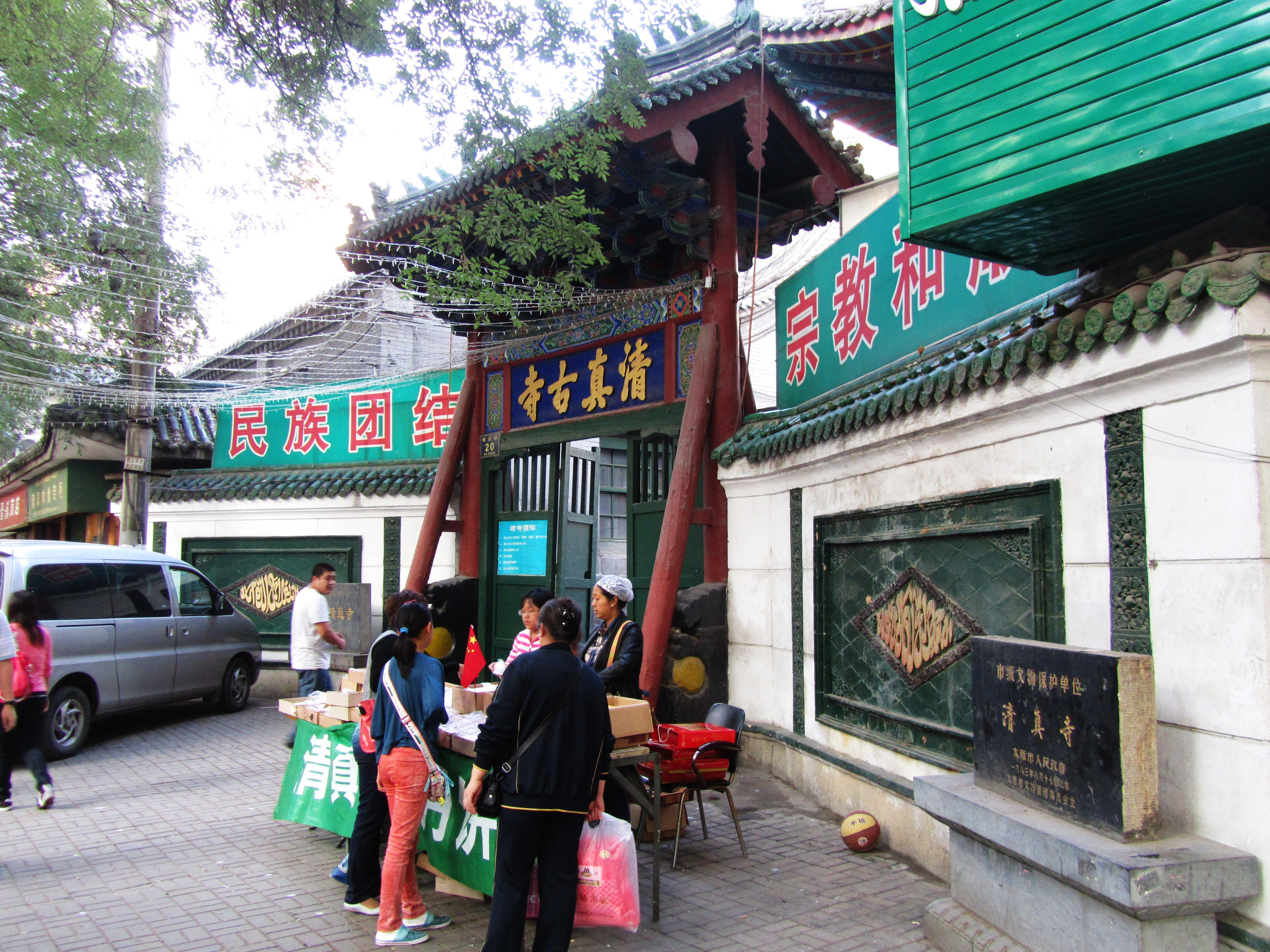

- Location of the mosque in Shanxi

Religion
- Affiliation: Islam
- Branch/tradition: Sunni
- Ecclesiastical or organizational status: mosque
- Status: Active

Location
- Location: Xinghualing, Taiyuan, Shanxi
- Country: China
- Interactive map of Taiyuan Ancient Mosque
- Coordinates: 37°51′48″N 112°33′15″E

Architecture
- Type: mosque
- Style: Chinese
- Completed: 8th century CE

Chinese name
- Chinese: 太原清真古寺
Transcriptions
Standard Mandarin
- Hanyu Pinyin: Tàiyuán Qīngzhēn Gǔsì

The Taiyuan Ancient Mosque (Chinese: 太原清真古寺; pinyin: Tàiyuán Qīngzhēn Gǔsì) is a mosque in Xinghualing District, in Taiyuan City, in the Shanxi province of China.

== Overview ==
The mosque was originally called the Qingxiu Mosque and was established in the 8th century CE during the Tang dynasty. It then went several renovations and reconstructions after 11th century. The existing building was mainly built during the Ming dynasty.

The mosque has the traditional Chinese architectural style and consists of two sahns. The main buildings include the gate, prayer hall, sermon hall, decorated archway, wudu, etc. The prayer hall combines the traditional Chinese and Islamic architectural styles.

== Transportation ==
The mosque is accessible west from Taiyuan Railway Station.

== See also ==
- Islam in China
- List of mosques in China
