= 2023 Yunnan protest =

Religious protest in Yunnan, China

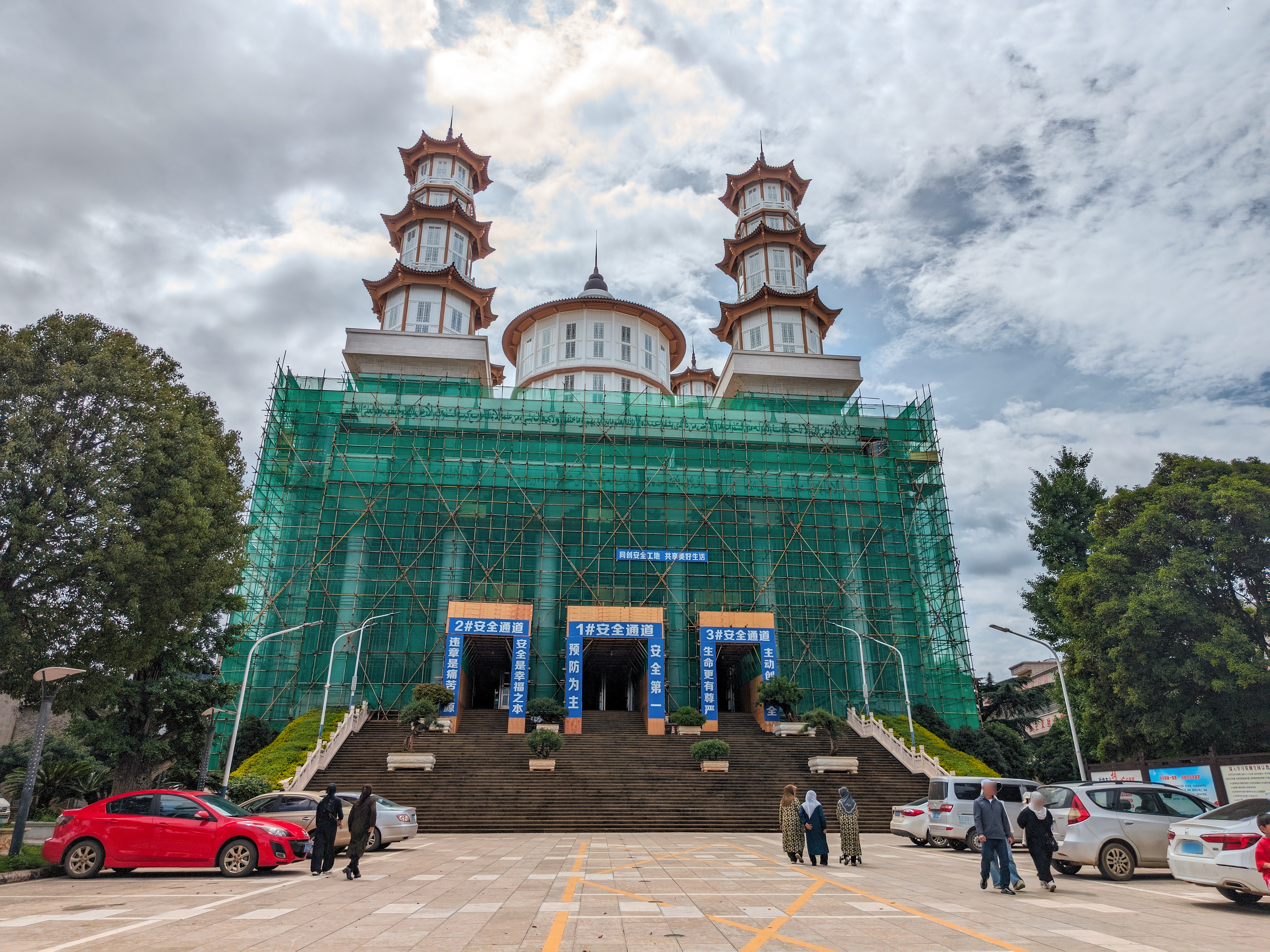
- The Najiaying Mosque adorned with traditional Chinese architectural features (August 2025)
- Date: May 2023
- Location: Yunnan Province, China
- Participants: Hui Muslims, Chinese government
- Outcome: Removal of dome and minarets, increased government surveillance

The 2023 Yunnan protest was held in late May 2023 in Nagu town, Yunnan province, China, where tens of thousands of ethnic minority Muslims came together to protect the Najiaying Mosque from authorities intending to demolish its dome and minarets. The demonstration is in protest of the Chinese government's repression of religious freedom, which is a component of a larger effort to "sinicize" religion and harmonise it with traditional Chinese culture.

== Background ==
The Najiaying Mosque, which belongs to the Hui ethnic group, was one of the few mosques still standing in China that resisted having any Islamic architectural elements removed. As the centre of Islam in the province of Yunnan, the mosque is significant historically and culturally. The "sinicization" effort seeks to stifle religious practise and purge religions of foreign influences.

Social media videos documented the tense standoff between riot police and thousands of Hui residents outside the mosque. The police resisted the protesters' demands for admittance during noon prayers. Residents threw things at the police, who responded by using batons, sparking fights. According to reports, dozens of demonstrators were detained.

After the demonstration, many neighbourhoods were without internet service, drones were monitoring the area, and police were pleading with the demonstrators to come forward over loudspeakers.
