= Shadian incident =

Muslim Hui uprising and killing

Shadian Incident
- Part of Cultural Revolution in China
- Photo of bodies of ethnic minority Hui Muslims, taken in the aftermath of the killing.
- Native name: 沙甸事件
- Location: Gejiu City, Yunnan, China
- Date: 1974–1975 (51 years ago)
- Attack type: Ethnic conflict, Civil unrest
- Deaths: 1,600 civilians, including 300 children
- Victim: Hui
- Perpetrators: People's Liberation Army, Chinese Communist Party, Militia etc.

The Shadian incident (Chinese: 沙甸事件; pinyin: Shādiàn shìjiàn) was an uprising of Muslim Hui people against the rule of Chinese Communist Party (CCP) during the Cultural Revolution, which was eventually suppressed by the People's Liberation Army in a massacre. In July and August, 1975, the uprising and the subsequent military suppression took place in several villages of Yunnan Province in southwest China, especially at the Shadian Town of Gejiu City. The estimated death toll was around 1,600 (with half deaths from Shadian alone) including 300 children, and 4,400 houses were destroyed.

The conflict between the CCP and local religious Hui people began in 1974, during the Cultural Revolution, when a group of Hui people went to Kunming, the capital city of Yunnan province, demanding the freedom of religion granted by the Constitution of China. However, local government deemed the behavior of the hundreds of protesters as "causing a disturbance" and "opposing the leadership of the Communist Party". In 1975, local Hui people attempted to forcefully re-open the mosques shut down by the government during the Cultural Revolution, escalating the conflict and attracting the attention of Beijing. On 29 July 1975, with approval from Chairman Mao Zedong, some 10,000 People's Liberation Army soldiers received a direct order from Deng Xiaoping to crack down on the uprising (some sources state that this order came from Wang Hongwen), resulting in a mass killing of Hui people.

== Historical background ==
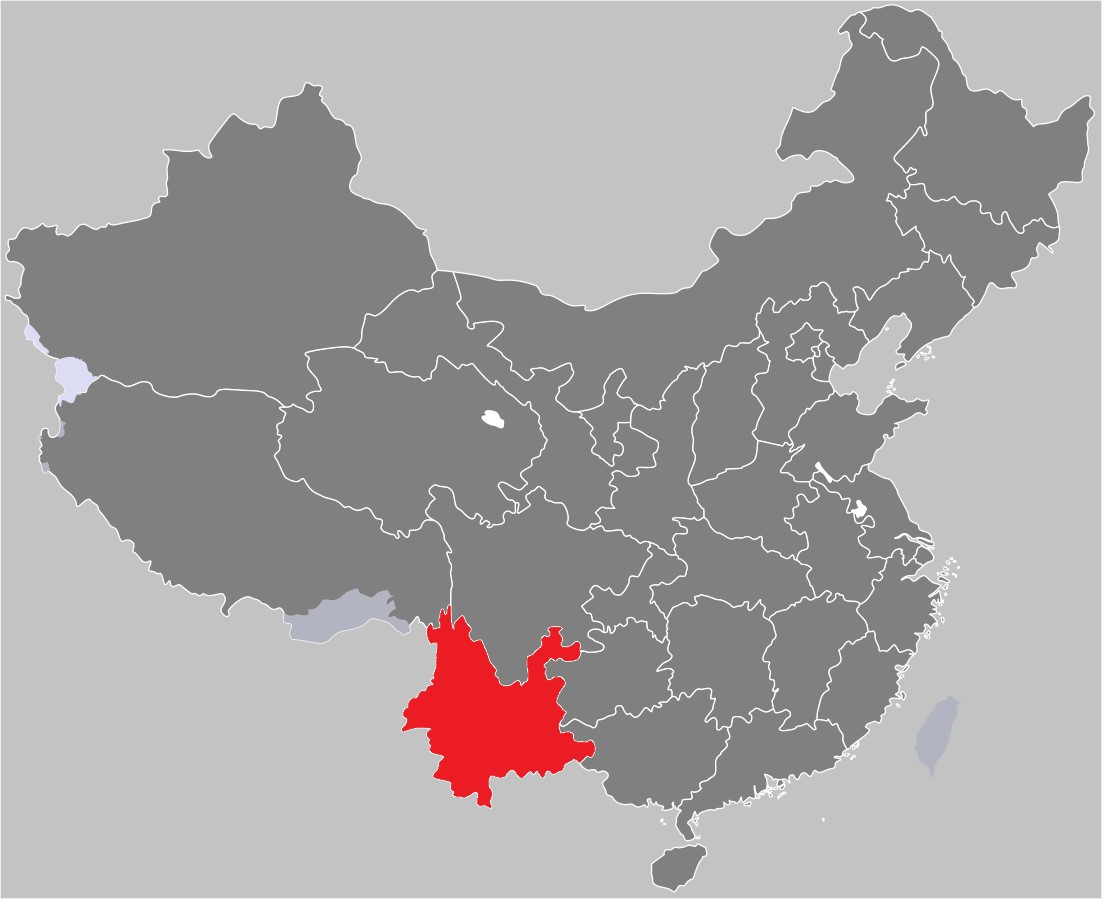
Yunnan Province (in red)

Shadian Town in Yunnan Province in southwest China had one of China's largest Hui populations, with a total of about 7,200 residents. During the Cultural Revolution (1966–1976), as part of the campaign to destroy the "Four Olds", the People's Liberation Army had shut down mosques and burned religious books. Many Muslims set up their own factions to preserve their rights as stated in the Constitution of China. Serious religious conflicts erupted there in 1964 and continued through the early 1970s.

== History of the incident ==
=== Initial conflicts ===
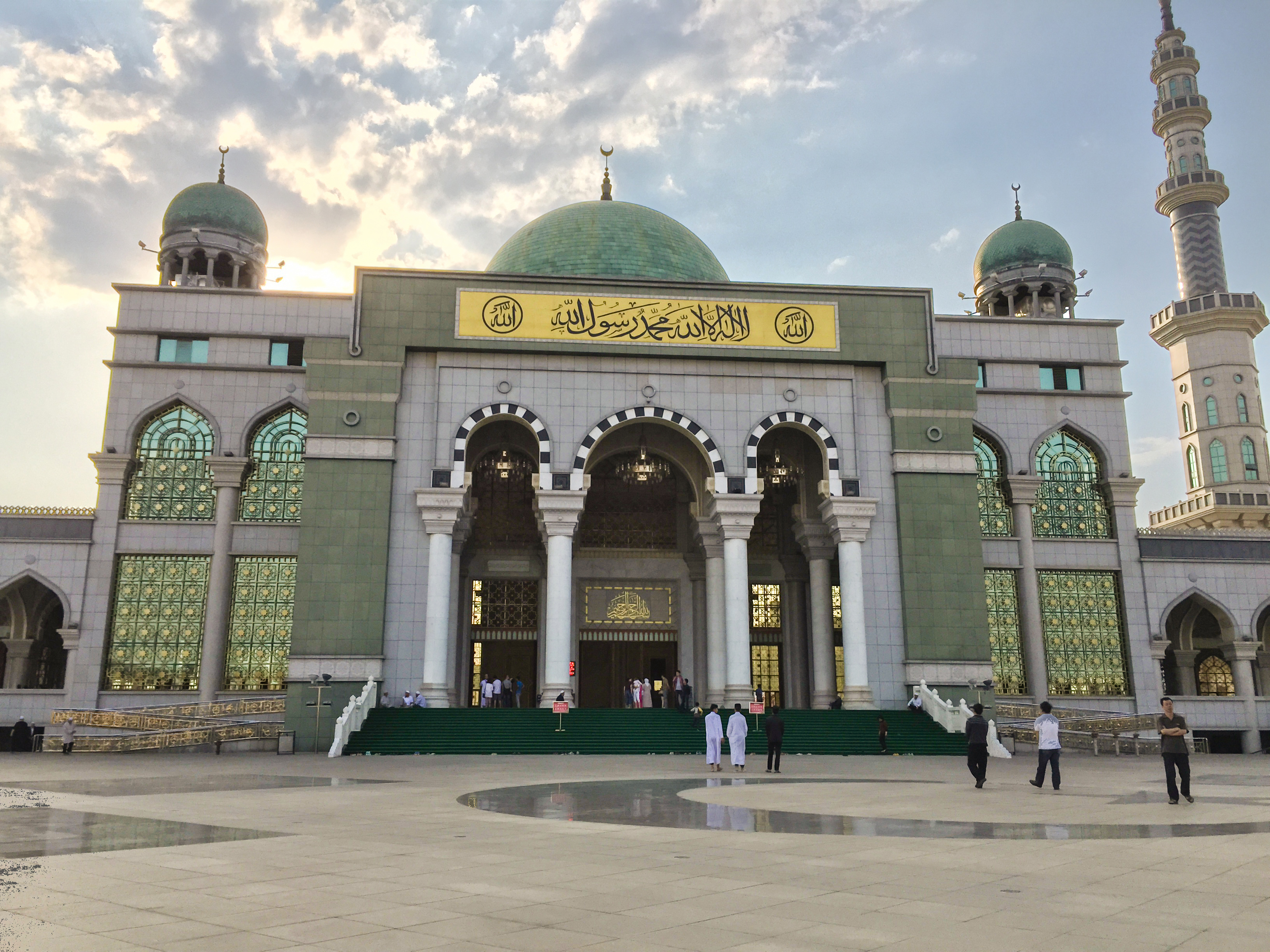
The Grand Mosque of Shadian in Yunnan, China prior to its 2024 sinicization

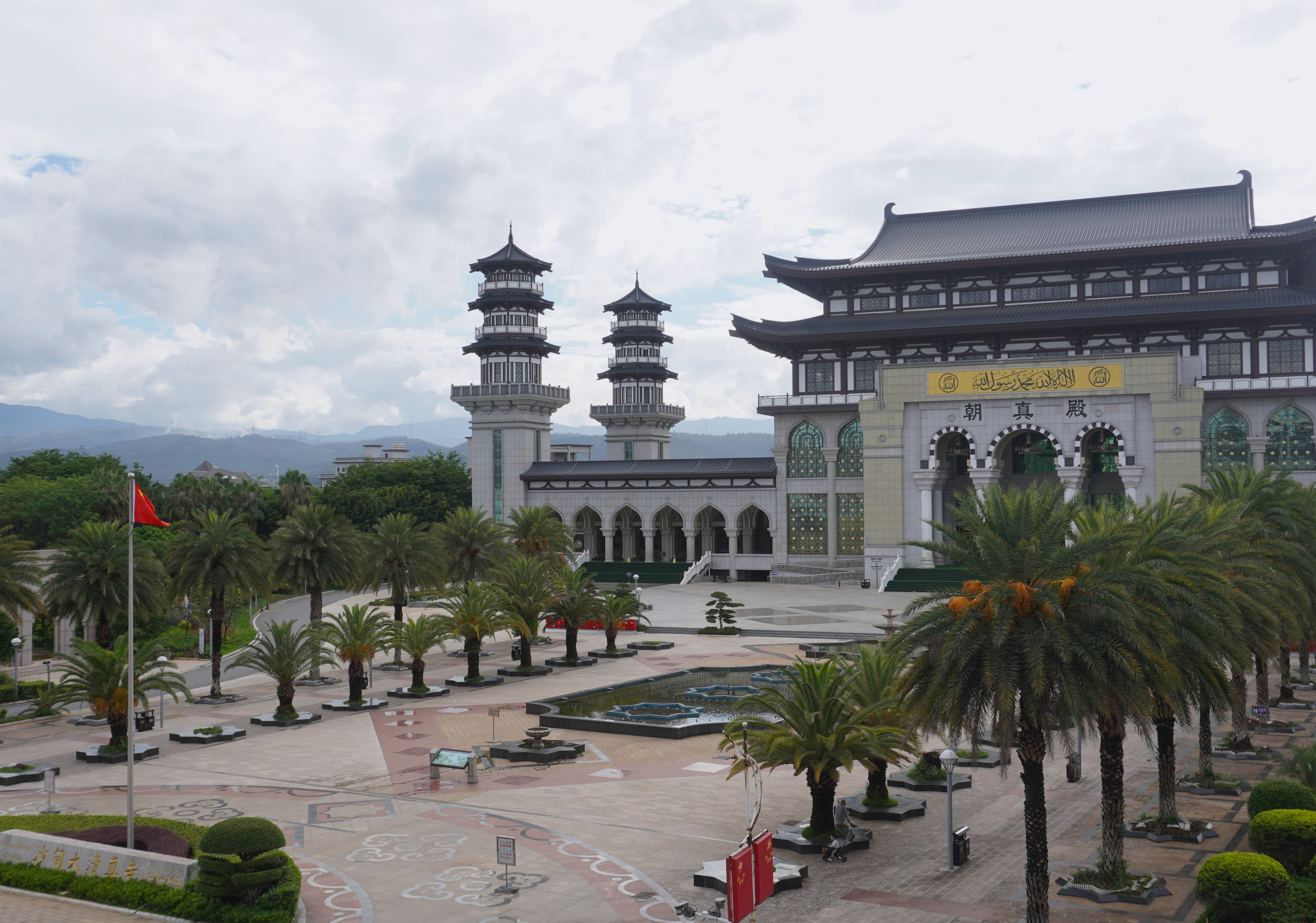
The mosque in 2025

In September 1974, an official notice from the Communist Party provincial committee in Yunnan was issued, ordering closure of all mosques within Yunnan province, which angered the local Hui population. More than 1,000 people went to Kunming (the capital city of Yunnan) to protest, and some even boarded a train to Beijing to complain. In particular, a group of more than 800 Muslims from Shadian Town went to Kunming, demanding the government honor the freedom of religion granted by the Constitution of China. However, the delegation was accused by government officials of creating a disturbance and opposing the leadership of the Communist Party.

Subsequently, violence erupted between a "Muslim Militia Regiment" and the non-Muslim county administration's command. In early 1975, representatives of both sides were called to a meeting in Beijing, where truce was brokered, only to be broken immediately on the ground in Shadian when confusion arose regarding how to handle the illegal weapons possessed by the local villagers. The situation further deteriorated when villagers tried to forcefully re-open the mosques and refused to pay grain tax to the state as a form of protest.

=== Military suppression and massacre ===
On 5 July 1975, the Central Committee of the CCP issued a directive signed by Chairman Mao Zedong, ordering the People's Liberation Army (PLA) to bring the situation under control if all other attempts to end the tense standoff failed. A string of conflicts ensued, and at the direct request of the provincial authorities, some 10,000 PLA soldiers were called in to settle the conflict. Within a week, hundreds of Hui people were killed and at least 4,400 houses destroyed in Shadian and nearby villages.

Government officials later stated that only around 130 people were killed, whereas most sources estimated that 1,600 Chinese Muslims, including 300 children, had lost their lives (some source claimed the death toll to be as high as 5,000). The PLA used guns, howitzers, flamethrowers, as well as bombardment from air during the suppression.

== Aftermath of the incident ==
=== Rehabilitation of victims ===
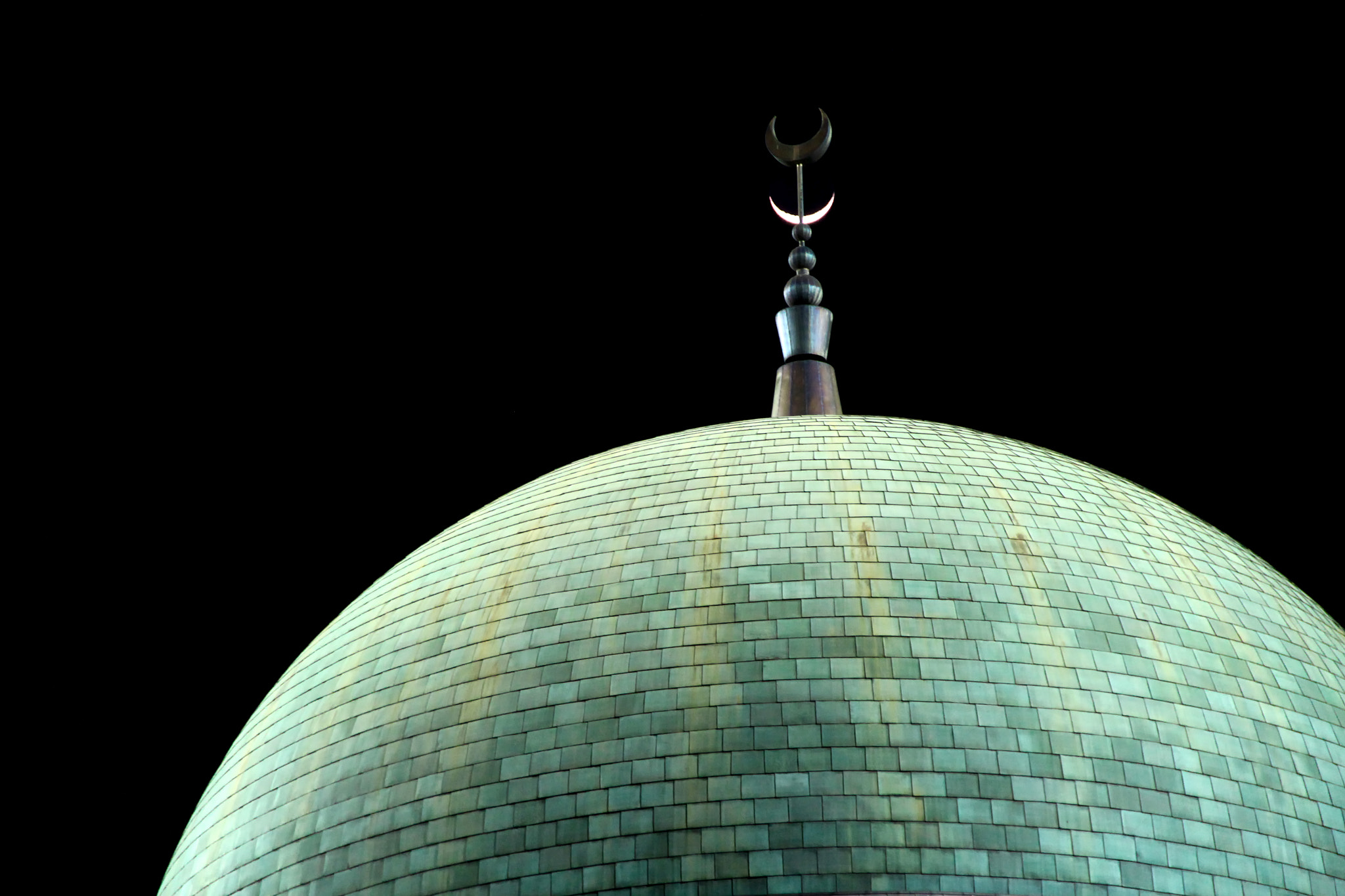
The dome of the Grand Mosque of Shadian prior to its 2024 sinicization

After the Cultural Revolution ended in 1976, the Communist Party provincial committee in Yunnan reviewed and investigated the Shadian Incident during the Boluan Fanzheng period, subsequently rehabilitating the victims and offering official apologies in February 1979. The local Hui people then received certain amount of reparations from the government for the damages suffered. The Communist Party under Deng Xiaoping blamed the worst and most violent parts of the Cultural Revolution on Lin Biao (who had been made a scapegoat by the Party after his death in 1971) and the Gang of Four.

=== Later government policies ===
After the launch of reform and opening up by Deng Xiaoping and his allies, such as Hu Yaobang, in 1978, as more and more Hui students got the opportunity for Islamic education abroad. As part of the reparations scheme, the government also erected a Martyr's Memorial in Shadian, to honor the 800 officially recognized victims whose graves surround the pathway that leads up to the memorial. The government also partially financed the building of the Great Mosque in Shadian which was completed in 2009. It now serves as the town center and a source of pride for the local Muslim community. After Xi Jinping came to power in 2012, religious conflicts re-emerged, and the Shadian problem continues to be an example of discord between the CCP and Islamic religious groups in China.

In 2022, the government began renovations to remove any features of Islamic architecture from the Grand Mosque of Shadian and replace them with architecture typical for Chinese-style pagodas. These renovations were completed in 2024.

== See also ==
- Mass killings under communist regimes
- List of massacres in China
- Zhao Jianmin Spy Case
- Boluan Fanzheng
- Xunhua Incident
