= Chinese architecture =

Architectural style

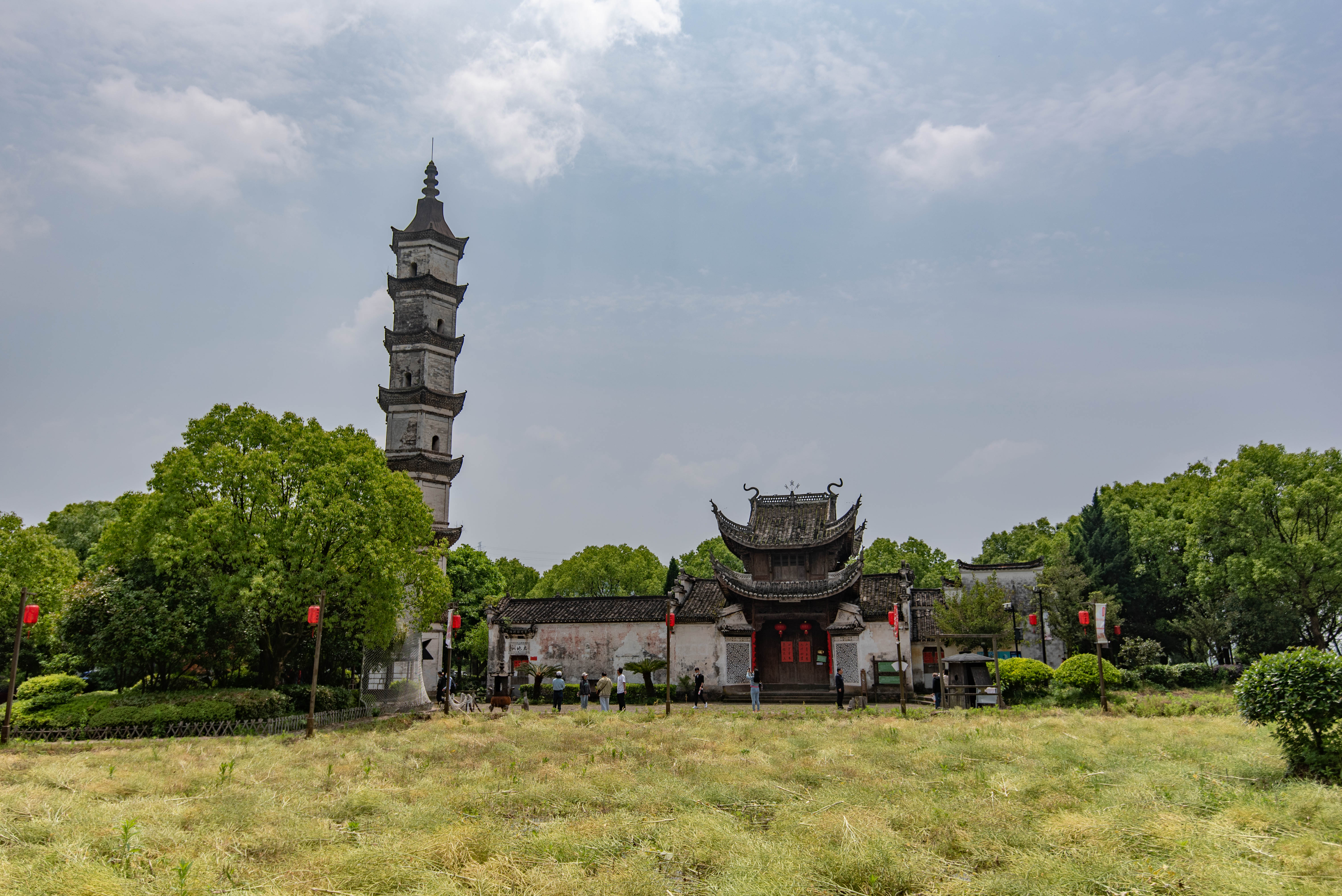
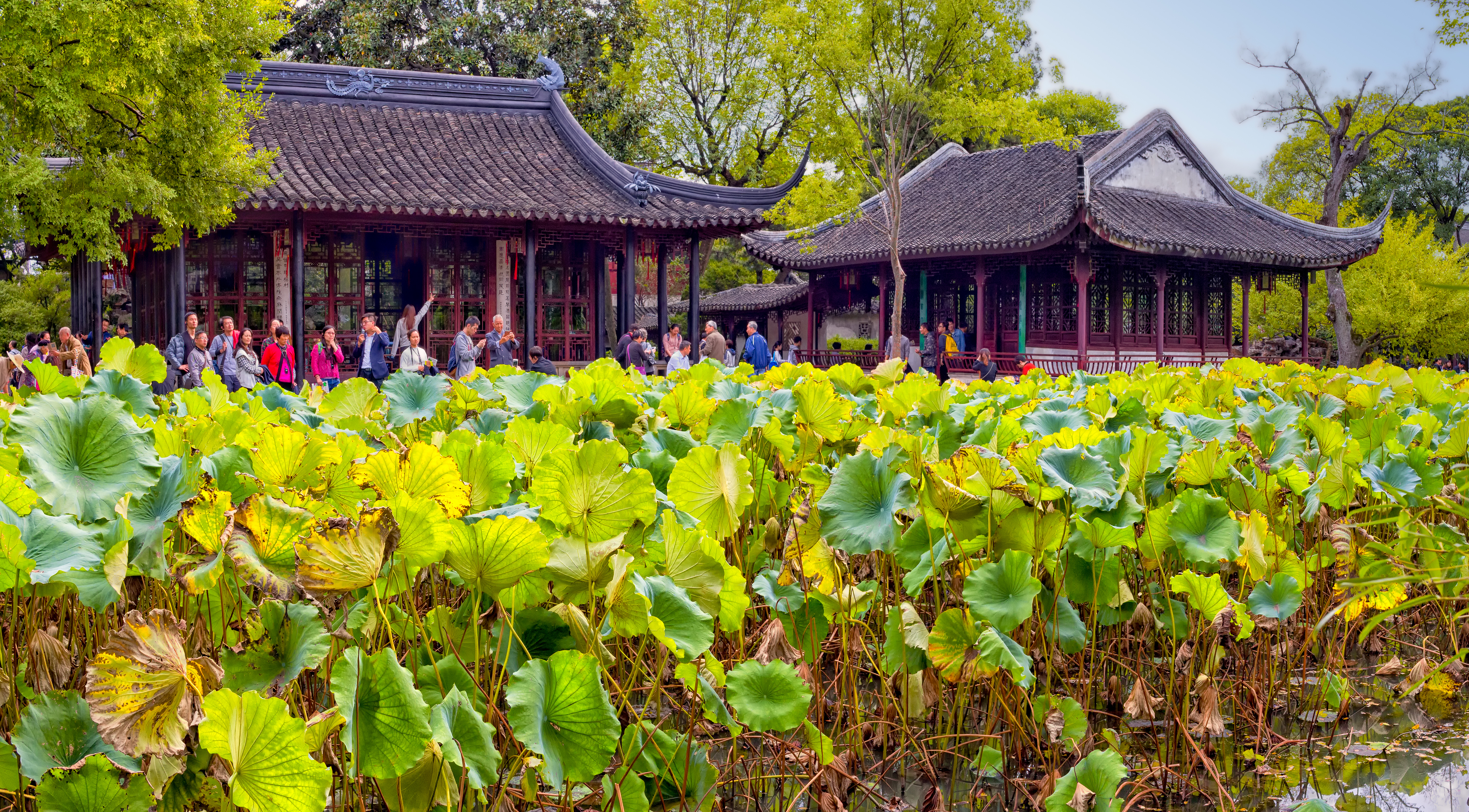
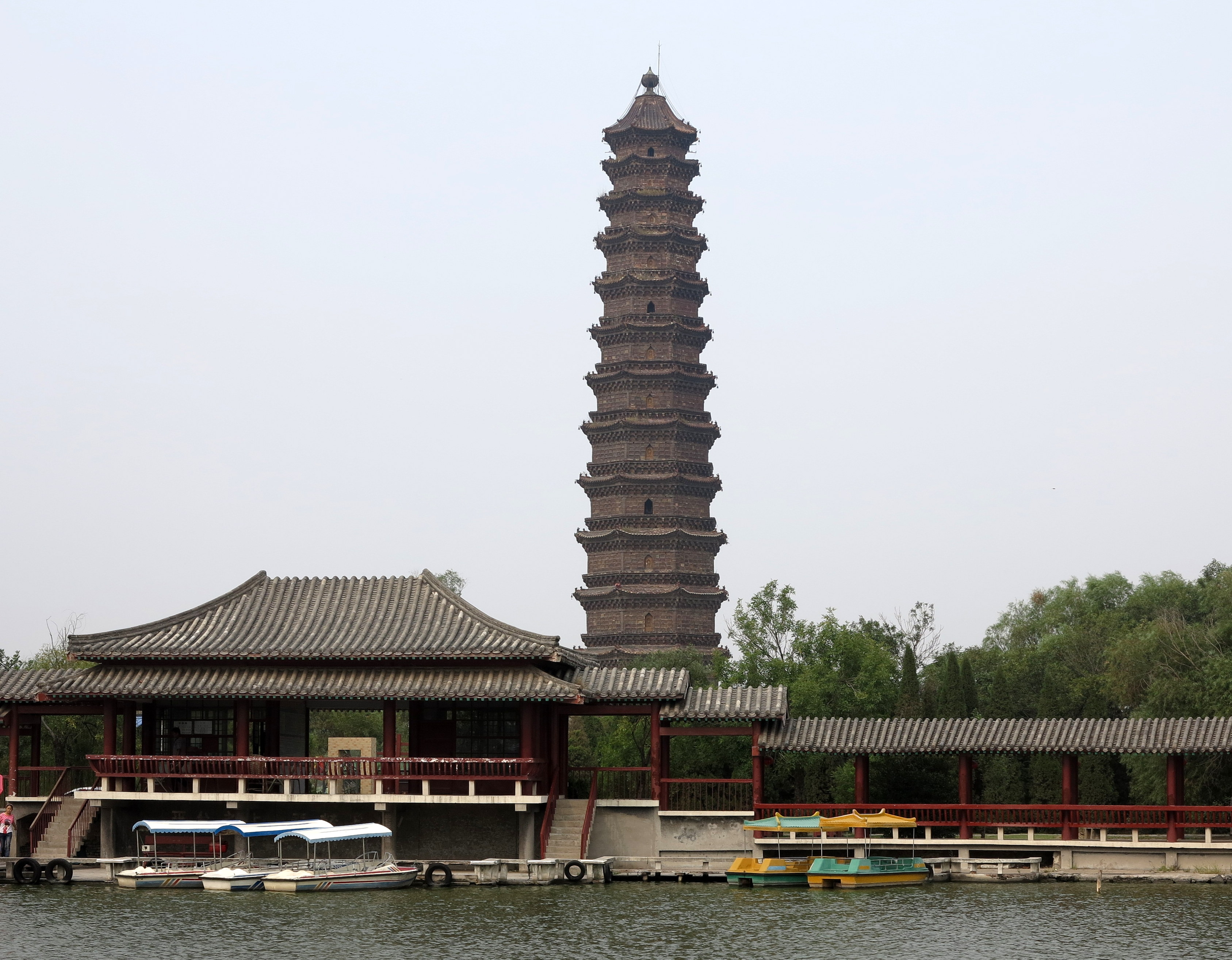
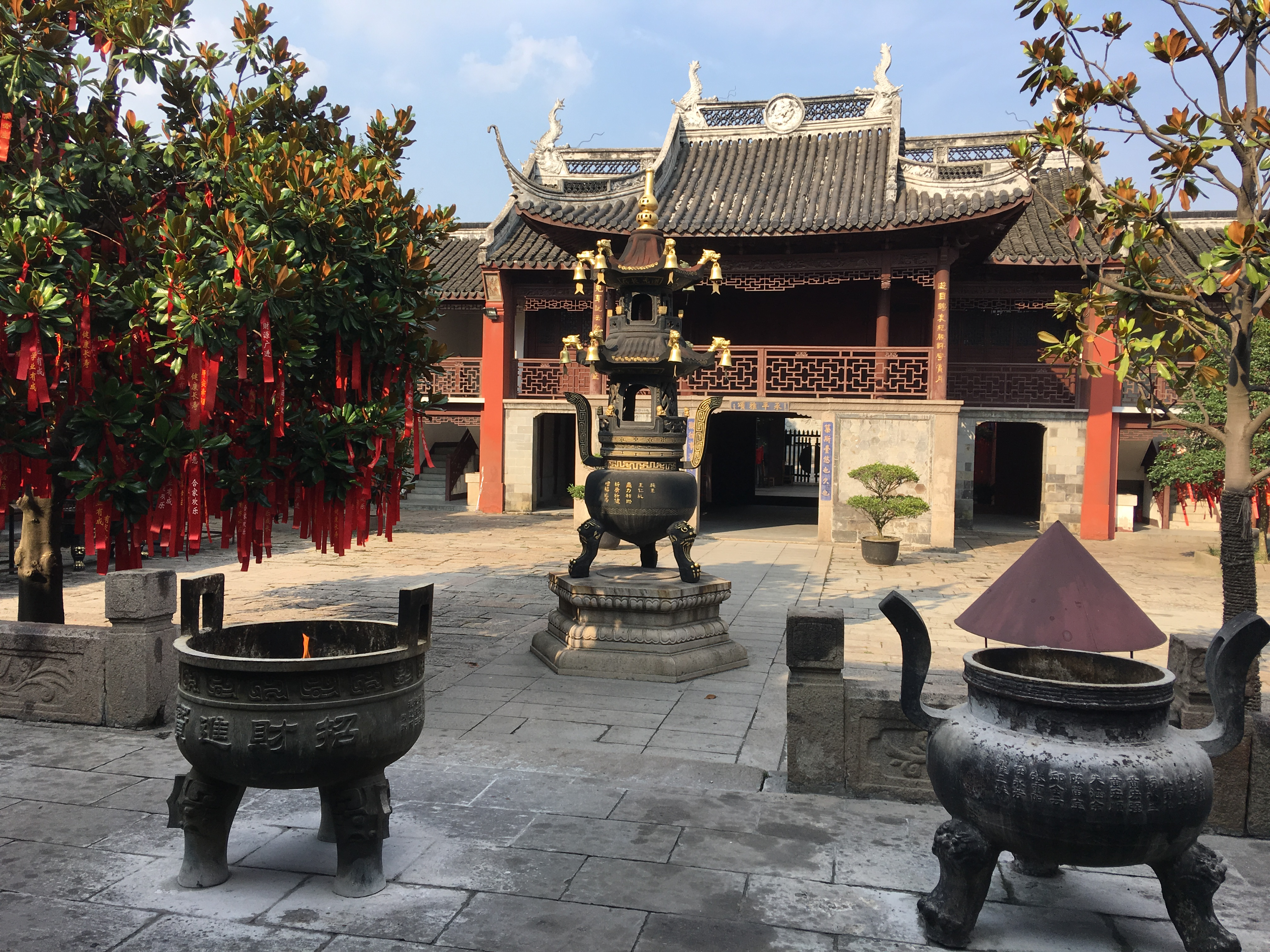
- Top: Jiande city Chinese shrine, Middle: The Humble Administrator's Garden and the Iron Pagoda, Bottom: The Zhujiajiao God Temple

Additional media
- Influenced: Japanese; Korean; Mongolian; Vietnamese

Chinese traditional architectural craftsmanship for timber-framed structures
- UNESCO Intangible Cultural Heritage
- Country: China
- Reference: 00223
- Region: Asia and the Pacific

Inscription history
- Inscription: 2009 (4th session)
- List: Representative

Chinese architecture is the embodiment of an architectural style that has developed over millennia in China and has influenced architecture throughout East Asia. Since its emergence during the early ancient era, the structural principles of its architecture have remained largely unchanged. The main changes involved diverse decorative details. Starting with the Tang dynasty, Chinese architecture has had a major influence on the architectural styles of neighbouring East Asian countries such as Japan, Korea, Vietnam, and Mongolia in addition to minor influences on the architecture of Southeast and South Asia including the countries of Malaysia, Singapore, Indonesia, Sri Lanka, Thailand, Laos, Cambodia, and the Philippines.

Chinese architecture is characterized by bilateral symmetry, use of enclosed open spaces, feng shui (e.g. directional hierarchies), a horizontal emphasis, and an allusion to various cosmological, mythological or in general symbolic elements. Chinese architecture traditionally classifies structures according to type, ranging from pagodas to palaces. Due to the frequent use of wood, a relatively perishable material, as well as few monumental structures built of more durable materials, much historical knowledge of Chinese architecture derives from surviving miniature models in ceramic and published diagrams and specifications.

Although unifying aspects exist, Chinese architecture varies widely based on status or affiliation, such as whether the structures were constructed for emperors, commoners, or for religious purposes. Other variations in Chinese architecture are shown in vernacular styles associated with different geographic regions and different ethnic heritages.

The architecture of China is as old as Chinese civilization. From every source of information—literary, graphic, exemplary—there is strong evidence testifying to the fact that the Chinese have always enjoyed an indigenous system of construction that has retained its principal characteristics from prehistoric times to the present day. Over the vast area from Chinese Turkistan to Japan, from Manchuria to the northern half of French Indochina, the same system of construction is prevalent; and this was the area of Chinese cultural influence. That this system of construction could perpetuate itself for more than four thousand years over such a vast territory and still remain a living architecture, retaining its principal characteristics in spite of repeated foreign invasions—military, intellectual, and spiritual—is a phenomenon comparable only to the continuity of the civilization of which it is an integral part.

— Liang Sicheng, 1984

In more recent times, China has become the most rapidly modernizing country in the world. In the past few decades, cities like Shanghai have completely changed their skyline, with some of the world's tallest skyscrapers dotting the horizon. China also has one of the most extensive high speed rail networks, connecting and allowing its large population to travel more efficiently.

Throughout the 20th century, Chinese architects have attempted to bring traditional Chinese designs into modern architecture. Moreover, the pressure for urban development throughout China requires high speed construction and a greater floor area ratio: thus, in cities the demand for traditional Chinese buildings (which are normally less than 3 levels) has declined in favor of high-rises. However, the traditional skills of Chinese architecture, including major and minor carpentry, masonry, and stonemasonry, are used in the construction of vernacular architecture in China's rural areas.

== History ==
=== Neolithic and early antiquity ===
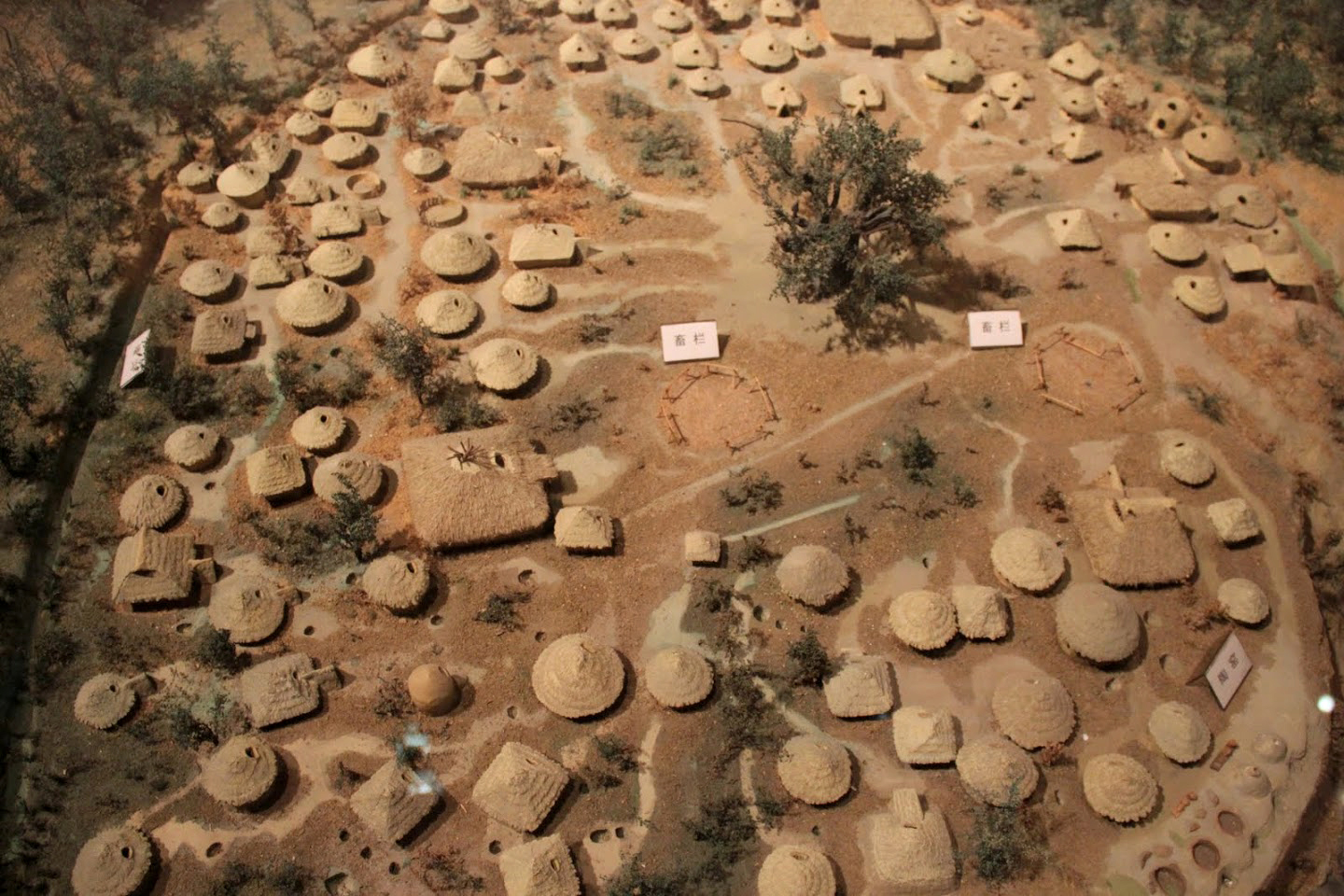
A model of Jiangzhai, a Yangshao village

Chinese civilizations and cultures developed in the plains along China's numerous rivers that emptied into Bohai and Hongzhow bays. The most prominent of these rivers, the Yellow and the Yangtze, hosted many villages. The climate was warmer and more humid than today, allowing millet to be grown in the north and rice in the south. However, Chinese civilization has no single "origin". Instead, it featured a gradual multinuclear development between 4000 and 2000 BC – from village communities to what anthropologists call cultures to states.

Two of the more important cultures were Hongshan culture (4700–2900 BC) to the north of Bohai Bay in Inner Mongolia and Hebei Province and contemporaneous Yangshao culture (5000–3000 BC) in Henan Province. Between the two, and developing later, was Longshan culture (3000–2000 BC) in the central and lower Yellow River valley. These combined areas gave rise to thousands of small/proto-states by 3000 BC. Some shared a common ritual center that linked them to a single symbolic order, but others developed more independently. The emergence of walled cities during this time is a clear indication that the political landscape was often unstable.

The Hongshan culture of Inner Mongolia (located along the Laoha, Yingjin, and Daling rivers that empty into Bohai Bay) was scattered over a large area but had a single, common ritual center of at least 14 burial mounds and altars over several ridges. It is dated to around 3500 BC, or possibly earlier. Although no evidence suggests village settlements nearby, its size is much larger than one clan or village could support. In other words, though rituals would have been performed there for the elites, the large area implies that audiences for the ritual would have encompassed all the villages of the Hongshan. As a sacred landscape, the center might have attracted supplicants from even further afield.

=== 20th century ===
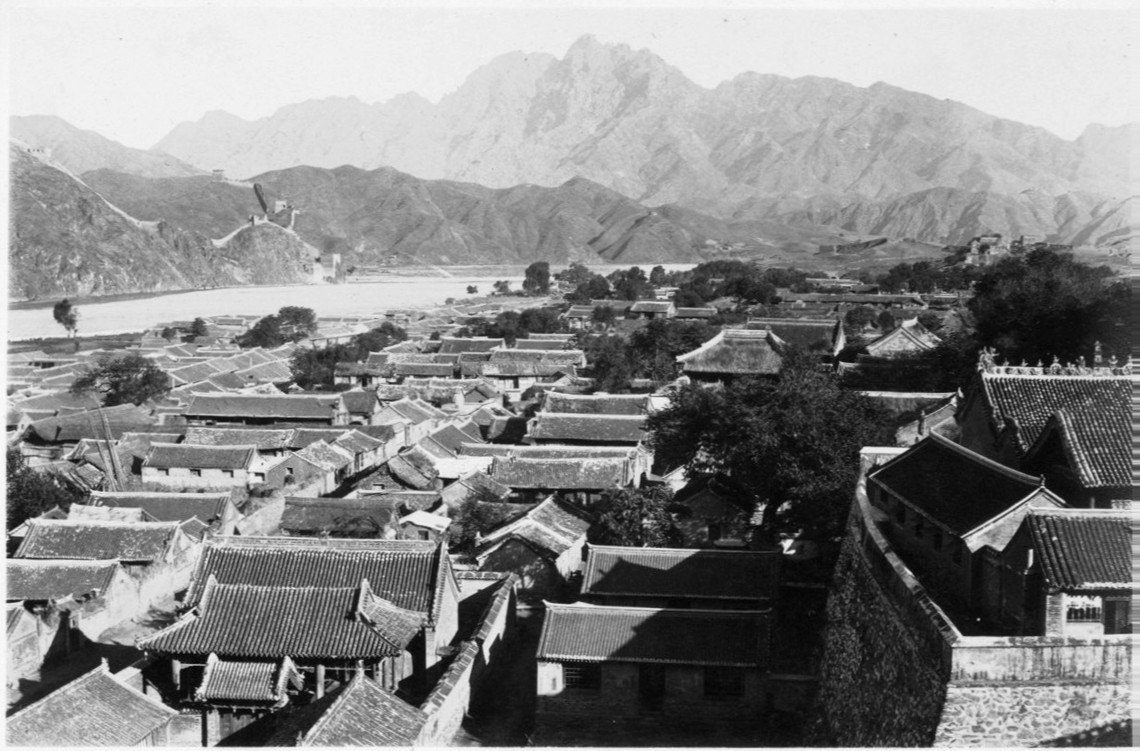
Traditional architecture lining the streets of Gubeikou, a garrison town on the northern side of the Great Wall along the Chao River, c. 1920s.

During the 1930s and the 1940s, architectural debate in China occurred over adaptation of Western modernism or using traditional Chinese architectural forms with modern materials and construction.

During the years 1952 to 1954, socialist realism from the Soviet Union influenced Chinese architecture. Modernism and the Chinese national style were other major trends in that period.

Architecture was a highly political topic in the middle of the 1950s.

During the Great Leap Forward, architectural projects were managed according to the strategy of the Three Simultaneities, a process that involved designing, preparing materials, and building at the same time.

Rammed earth construction was both practically and ideologically important during the rapid construction of the Daqing oil field and the related development of Daqing. The "Daqing Spirit" represented deep personal commitment in pursuing national goals, self-sufficient and frugal living, and urban-rural integrated land use. Daqing's urban-rural landscape was said to embody the ideal communist society described by Karl Marx because it eliminated (1) the gap between town and country, (2) the gap between workers and peasants, and (3) the gap between manual and mental labor.

Drawing on the Daqing experience, China encouraged rammed earth construction in the mid-1960s. Starting in 1964, Mao Zedong advocated for a "mass design revolution movement". In the context of the Sino-Soviet split, Mao urged that planners should avoid the use of Soviet-style prefabricated materials and instead embrace the proletarian spirit of on-site construction using rammed earth. The Communist Party promoted the use of rammed earth construction as a low-cost method which was indigenous to China and required little technical skill.

Reinforced concrete, brick-infill, and prefabricated materials were used increasingly following the Wall Reform Movement of 1973–1976 and were promoted in publications such as Architectural Journal.

In 2014, the city of Datong started to rebuild the Datong ancient city wall and buildings in traditional architecture, although the effort received skepticism and opposition by citizens, many later praised the mayor for bringing back traditional Chinese aesthetics. Starting with the Northern Wei dynasty 1,600 years ago, Datong was a beautiful capital. It continued to thrive in the Liao and Jin dynasties, and later regained prominence as a major strategic centre in the Ming dynasty (1368–1644).

== Geography ==
Vernacular Chinese architecture shows variations related to local terrain and climate.

== Features ==
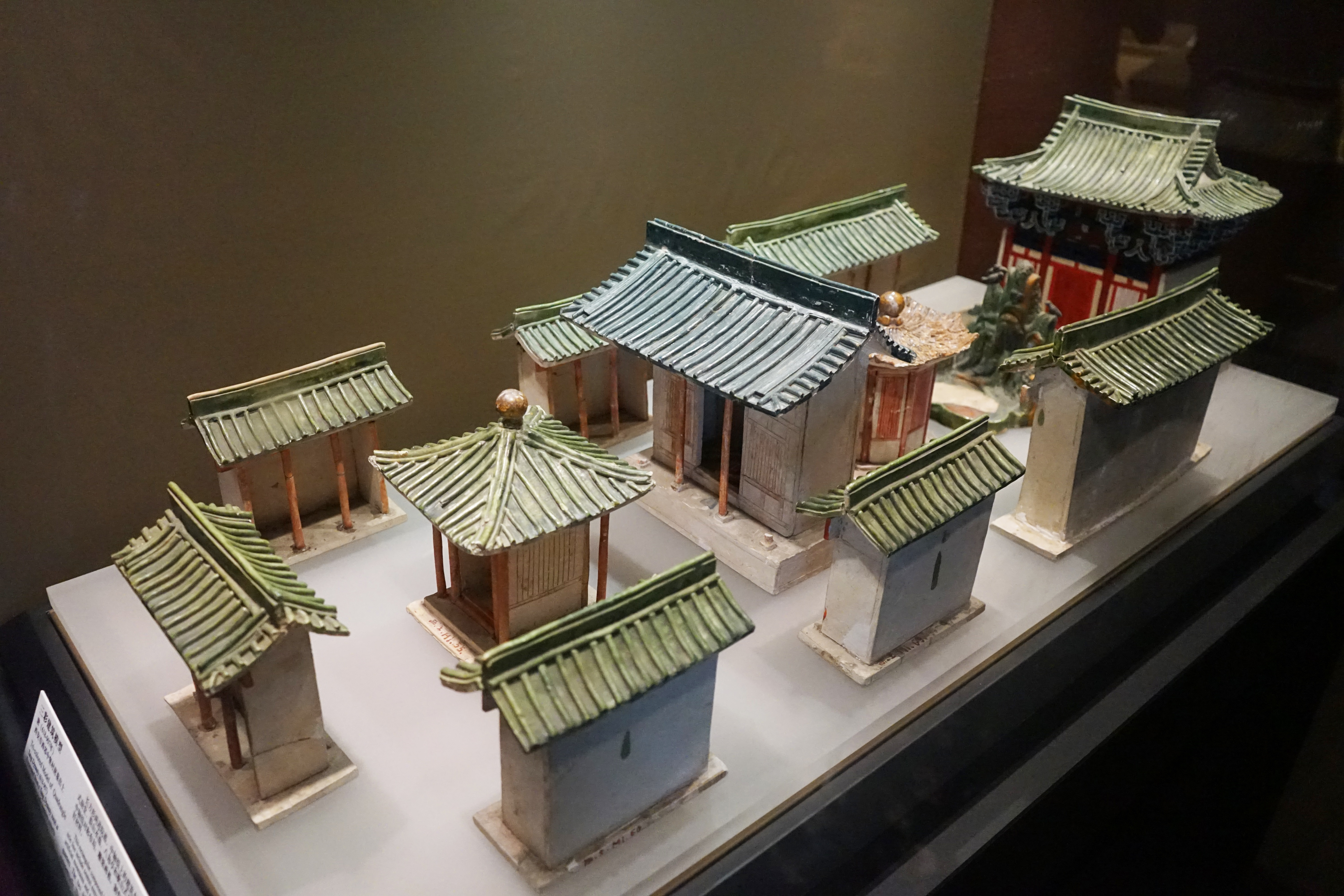
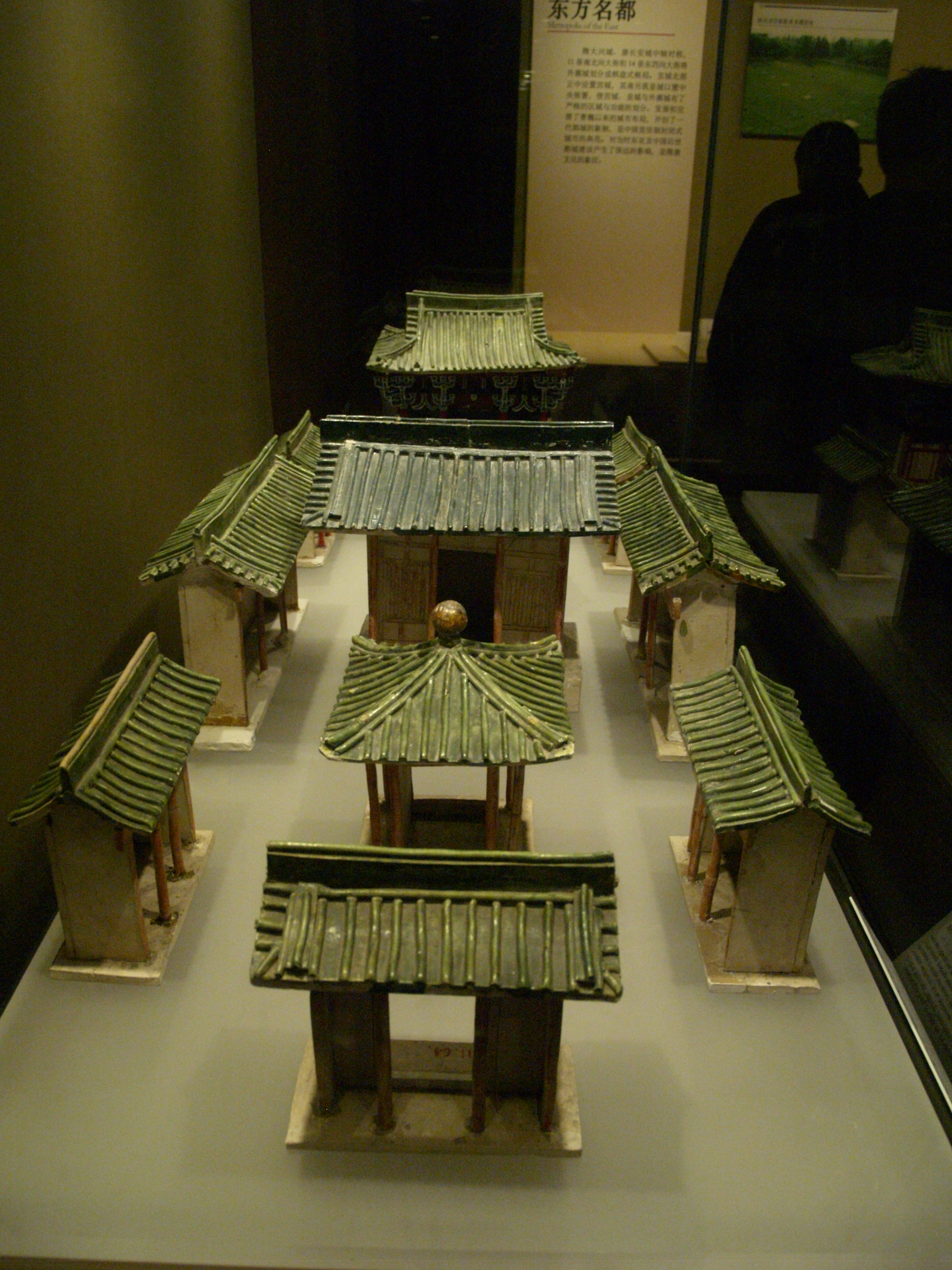
A sancai (tri-colored) ceramic mansion from the Tang dynasty (618–907), excavated from a Tang era tomb at Zhongbu village in the western suburbs of Xi'an.
The rectangular compound has two sections of courtyards. The buildings on the axis include central entrance, four-pointed pavilion, mountain-shaped front hall, artificial mountain and ponds, eight-pointed pavilion and mountain-shaped retiring quarters. The two sides of the axis are arranged with corridor rooms symmetrically.

=== Bilateral symmetry ===
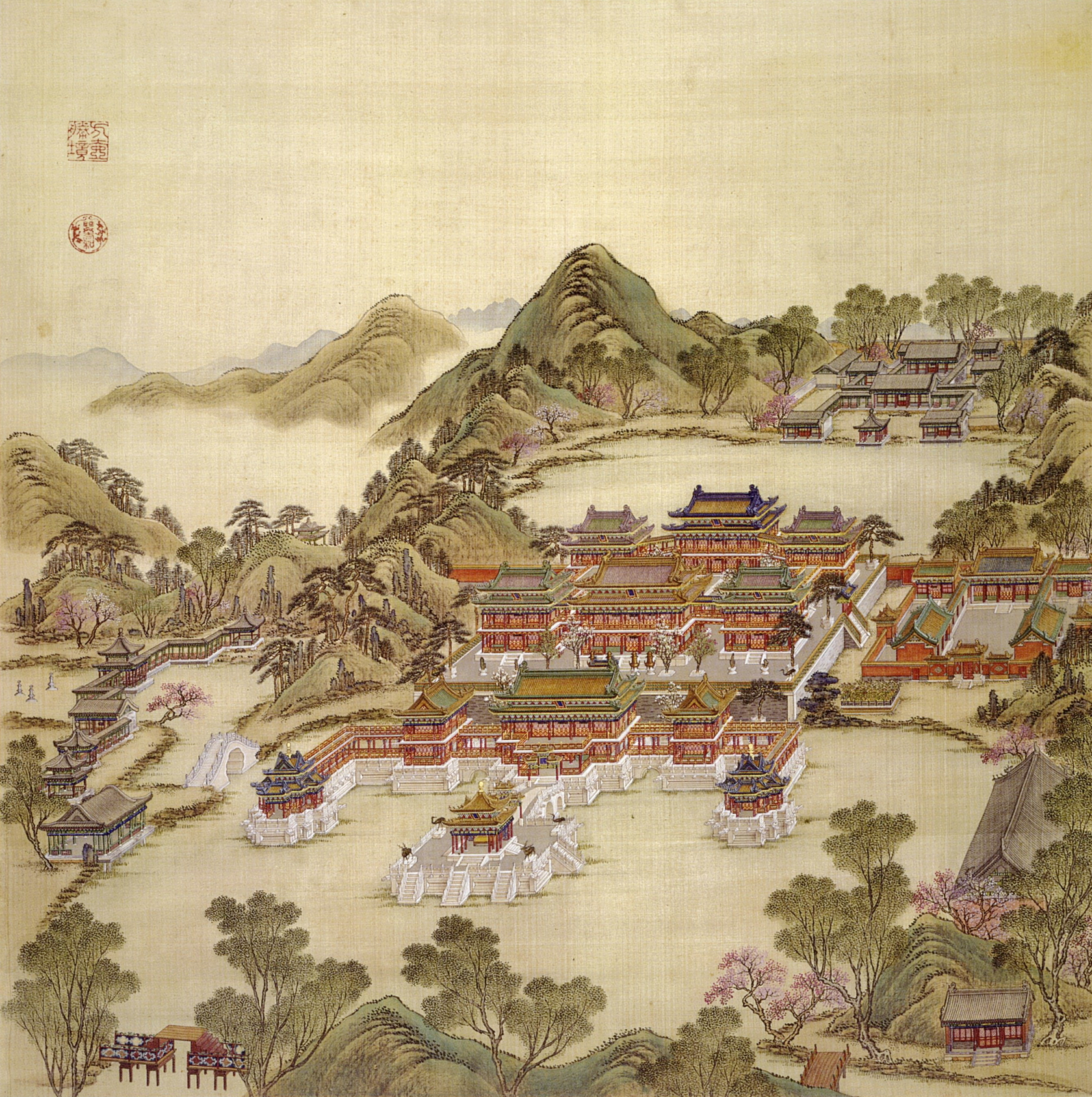
The Wonderland of Fanghu in the Old Summer Palace. It was destroyed by Anglo-French Allied Forces in 1860. (Fanghu is one of the wonderlands on the sea in Chinese myths. It is the same as Fangzhang. "方壶", 同"方丈", 是中国传说中海上三仙山之一.)

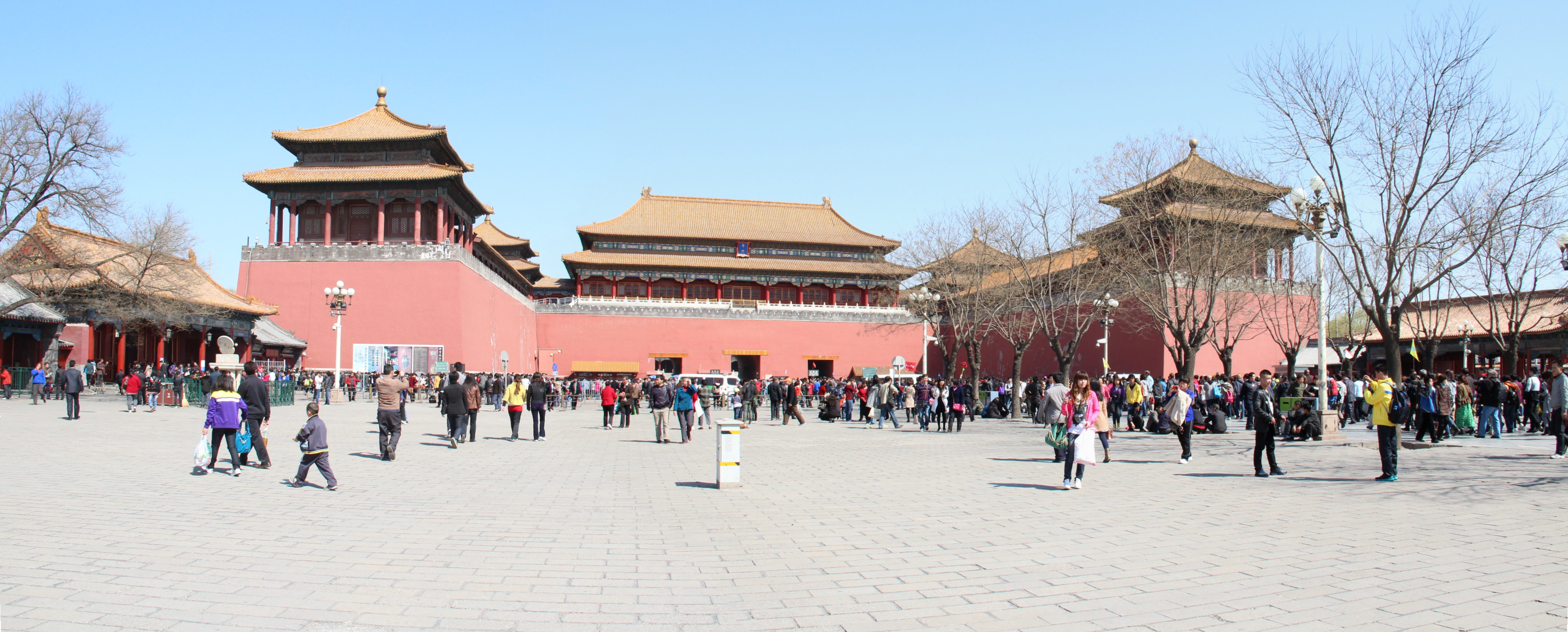
The Meridian Gate of the Forbidden City

An important feature in Chinese architecture is its emphasis on articulation and bilateral symmetry, which there signifies balance. These are found everywhere in Chinese architecture, from palace complexes to humble farmhouses. Secondary elements are positioned on either side of the main structures as wings to maintain overall symmetry. Buildings are typically planned to contain an even number of columns to produce an odd number of bays (間). Placing the main door in the center bay maintains symmetry.

In contrast to buildings, Chinese gardens tend to be asymmetrical. Gardens are designed to provide enduring flow. The design of the classic Chinese garden is based on the ideology of "Nature and Man in One", as opposed to the home itself, which shows the human sphere co-existing with, but separate from nature. The intent is that people feel surrounded by, and in harmony with, nature. The two essential garden elements are stones and water. The stones signify the pursuit of immortality, while water represents emptiness and existence. The mountain belongs to yang (static beauty), and the water belongs to yin (dynamic wonder). They depend on each other and complete each other.

=== Enclosure ===
In much Chinese architecture, buildings or building complexes surround open spaces. These enclosed spaces come in two forms:

- Courtyard (院): Open courtyards are a common feature in many projects. This is best exemplified in Siheyuan: It consisted of an empty space surrounded by buildings connected with one another either directly or through verandas.
- "Sky well" (天井): Although large open courtyards are less commonly found in southern Chinese architecture, the concept of an "open space" surrounded by buildings can be seen in the southern building structure known as the "sky well". This structure is essentially a relatively enclosed courtyard formed from the intersections of closely spaced buildings and offers a small opening to the sky through the roof space.

These enclosures aid in temperature regulation and in ventilation. Northern courtyards are typically open and face south to allow the maximum exposure of the building windows and walls to the sun while keeping out the cold north winds. Southern sky wells are relatively small and collect rainwater from the roof tops. They perform the same duties as the Roman impluvium while restricting the amount of sunlight that enters the building. Sky wells also vent hot air skyward, which draws cool air from the lower areas and the outside.

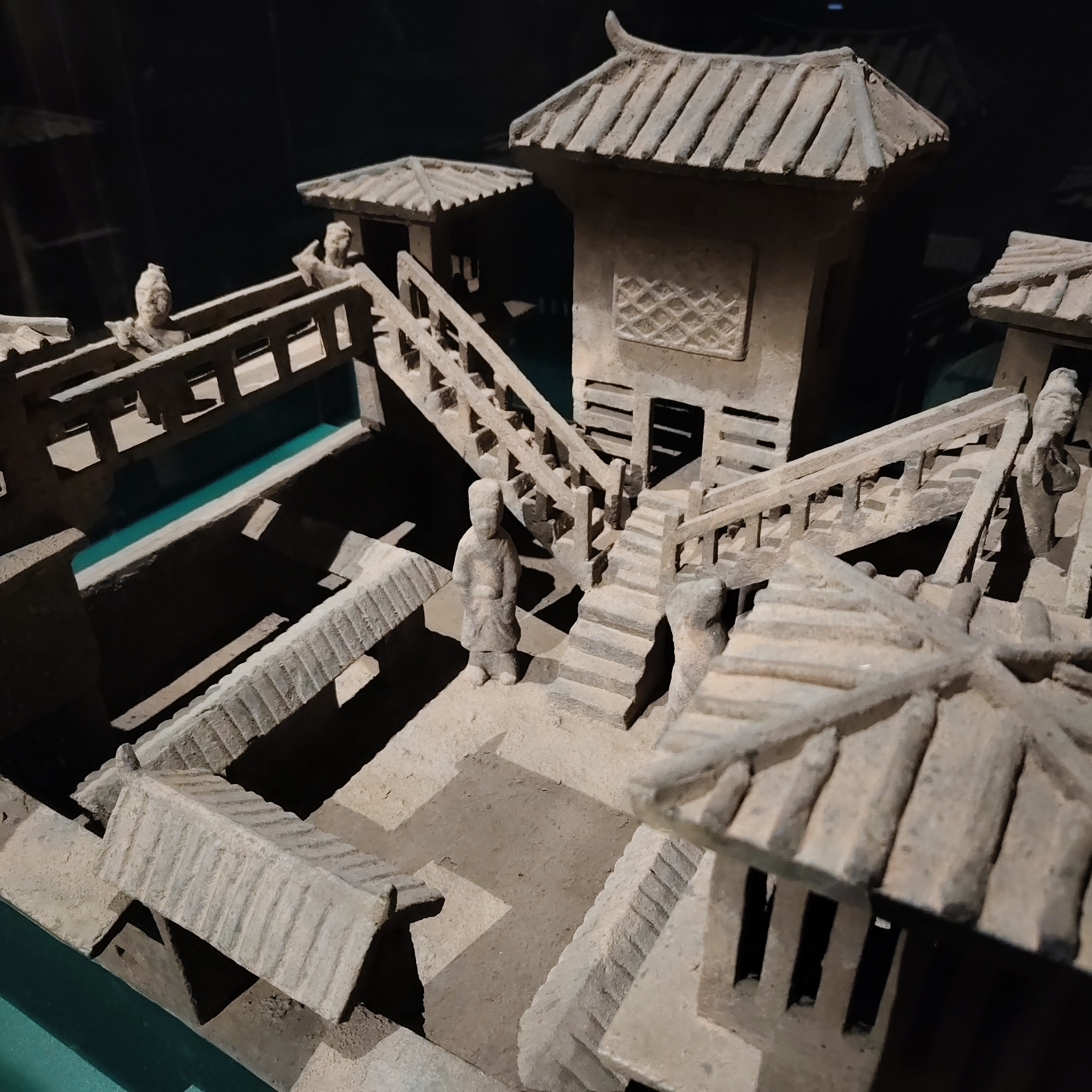
A Han dynasty pottery model of a courtyard within a manor.

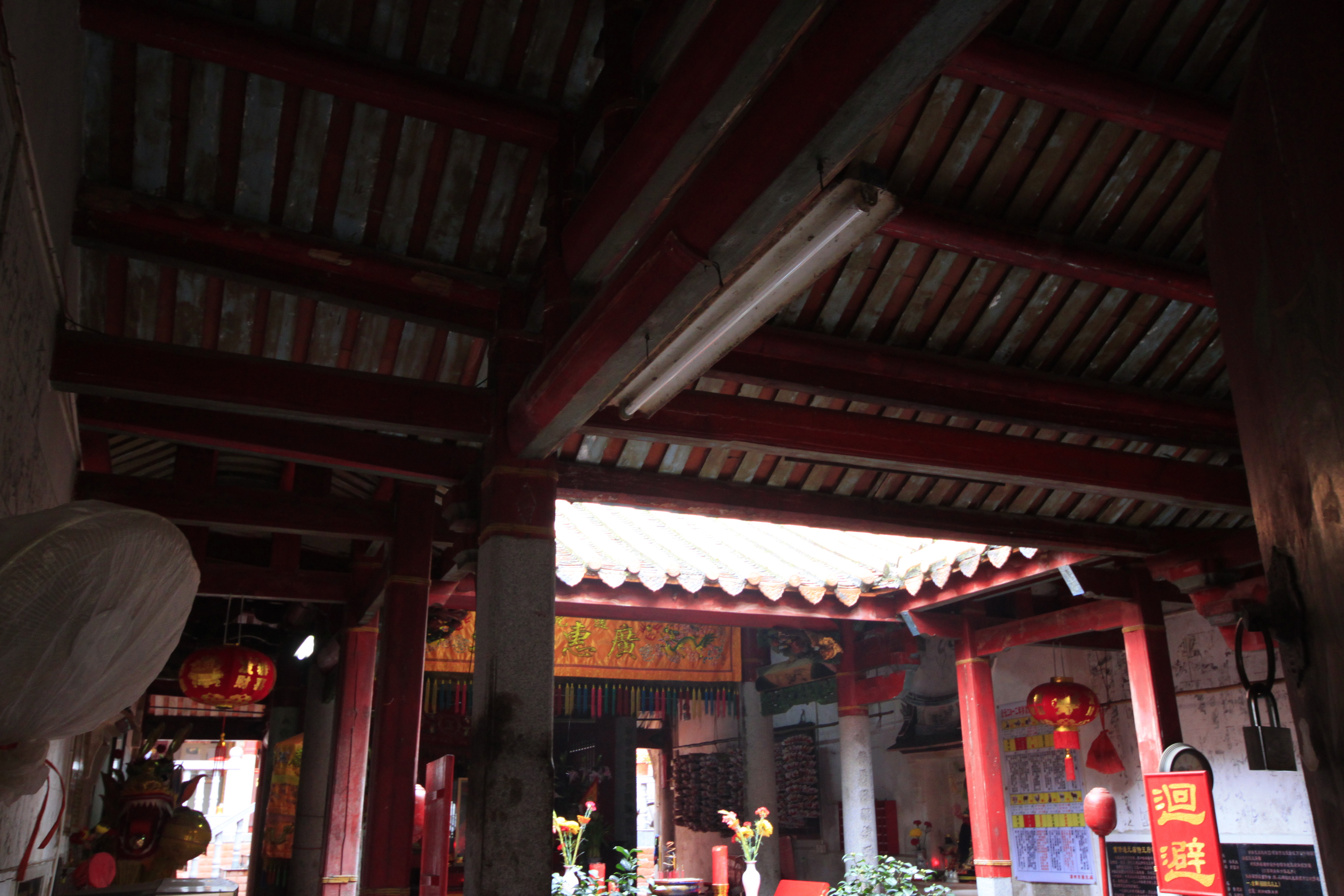
A skywell in a Fujian temple with enclosing halls and bays on four sides.

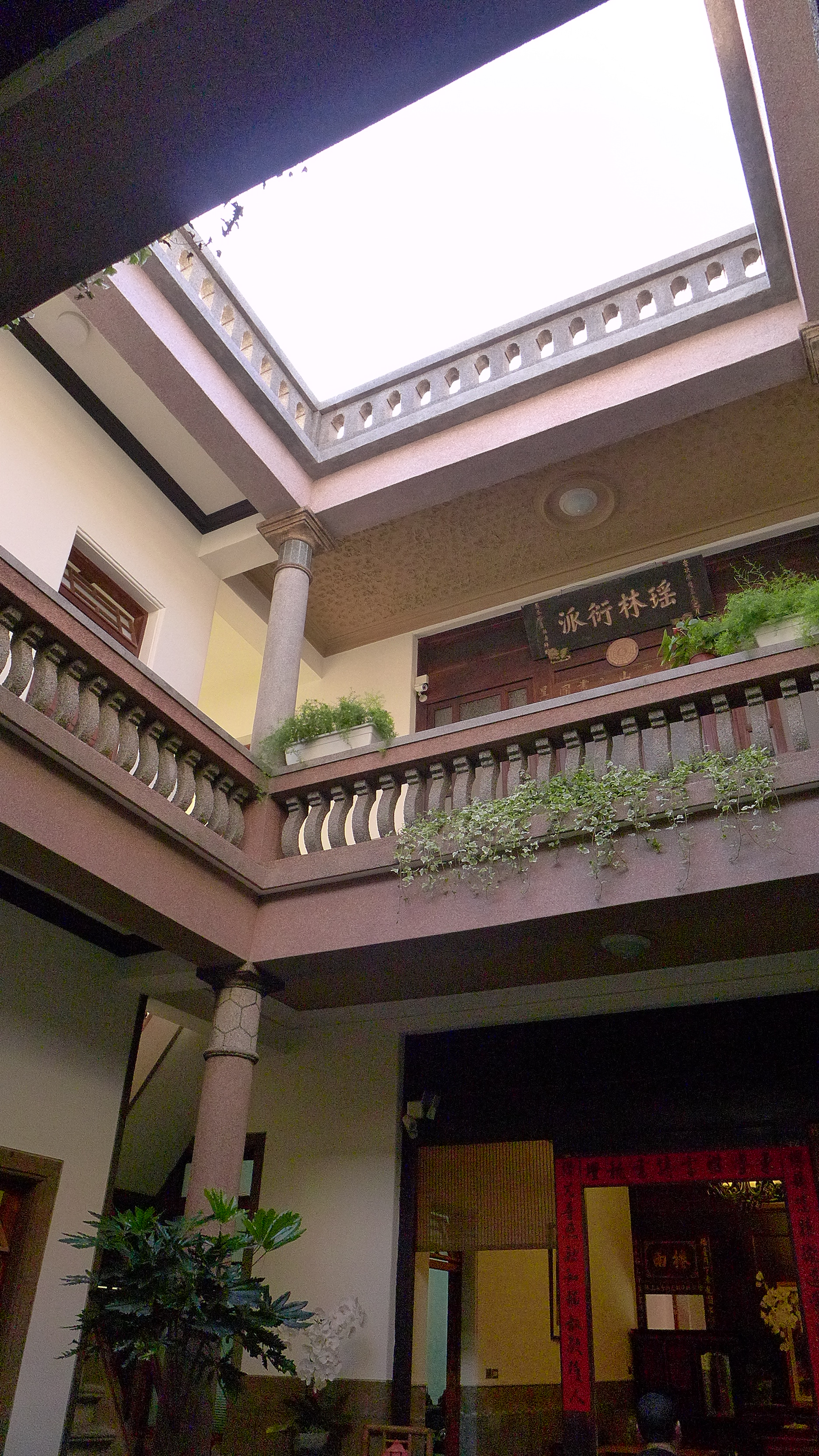
A mid-20th-century colonial style Taiwanese building containing a skywell.

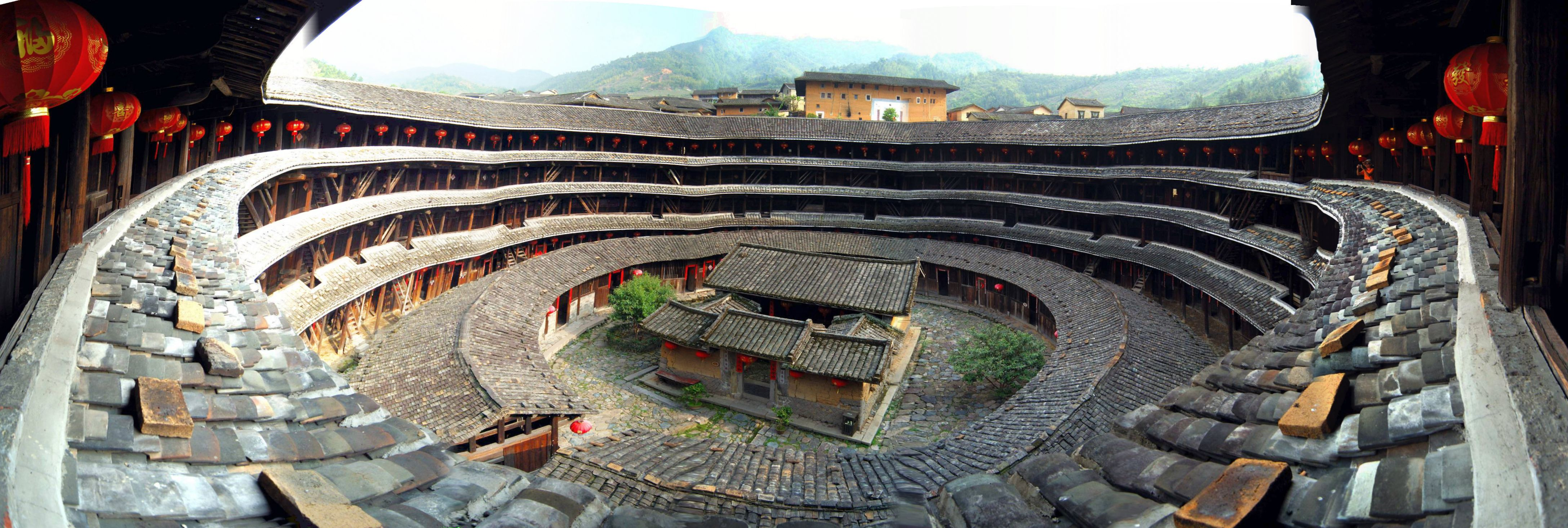
A tulou outer building encloses a smaller circular building, which encloses an ancestral hall and courtyard in the center.

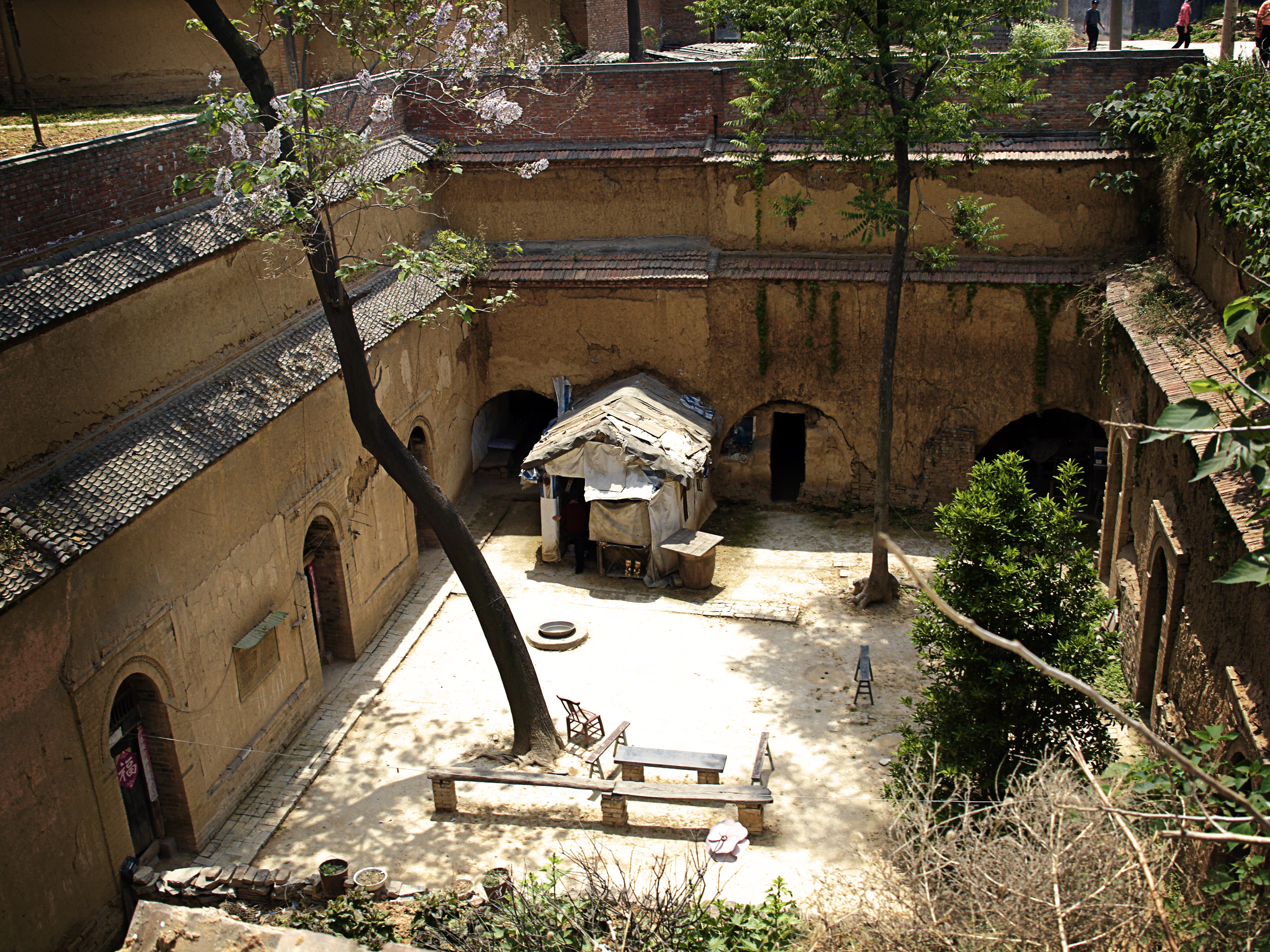
A dugout dwelling enclosing an underground courtyard.

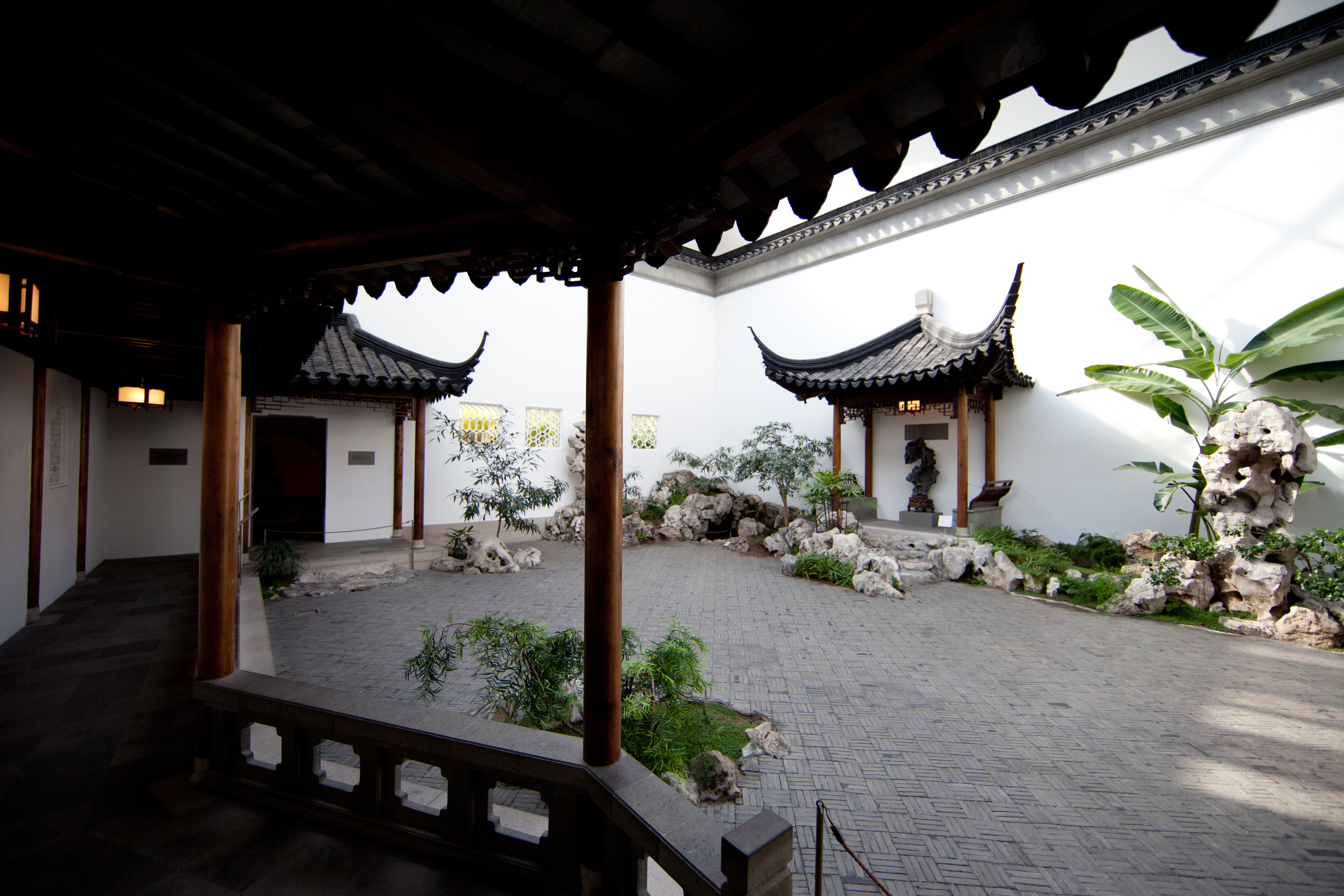
An enclosing courtyard on four sides from the Astor Court in the Metropolitan Museum of Art, New York City, USA.

=== Hierarchy ===
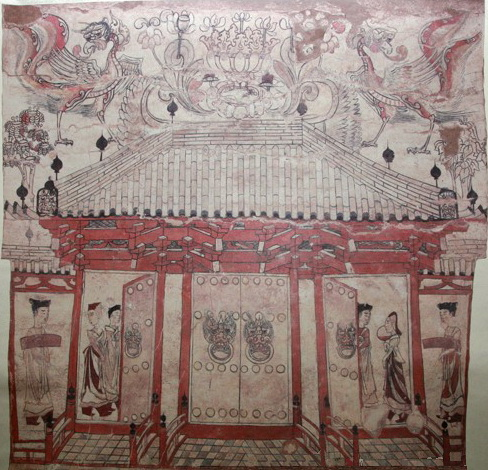
A tomb mural of Xinzhou, dated to the Northern Qi (550–577 AD) period, showing a hall with a tiled roof with chiwei roof ornaments, dougong brackets, and doors with giant door knockers (perhaps made of bronze)

The projected hierarchy of importance for different building uses in Chinese architecture is based on the strict placement of buildings in a property/complex. Buildings with doors facing the front of the property are considered more important than those facing the sides. Buildings facing away from the front are the least important.

South-facing buildings in the rear and more private areas with higher exposure to sunlight are held in lower esteem and reserved for elders or ancestral plaques. Buildings facing east and west are generally for junior members or branches of the family, while buildings near the front are typically for servants and hired help.

Front-facing buildings in the back of properties are used for celebratory rites and for the placement of ancestral halls and plaques. In multi-courtyard complexes, central courtyards and their buildings are considered more important than peripheral ones, the latter typically for storage, servants' rooms, or kitchens.

=== Horizontal emphasis ===
Classical Chinese buildings, especially those of the wealthy, are built with an emphasis on breadth and less on height, featuring an enclosed heavy platform and a large roof that floats over this base, with the vertical walls deemphasized. Buildings that were too high and large were considered unsightly, and therefore generally avoided. Chinese architecture stresses the visual impact of the width of the buildings, using sheer scale to inspire awe. This preference contrasts with Western architecture, which tends to emphasize height and depth. This often meant that pagodas towered above other buildings.

The halls and palaces in the Forbidden City have rather low ceilings when compared to equivalent stately buildings in the West, but their external appearance suggests the all-embracing nature of imperial China. These ideas have found their way into modern Western architecture, for example through the work of Jørn Utzon.

=== Cosmological concepts ===
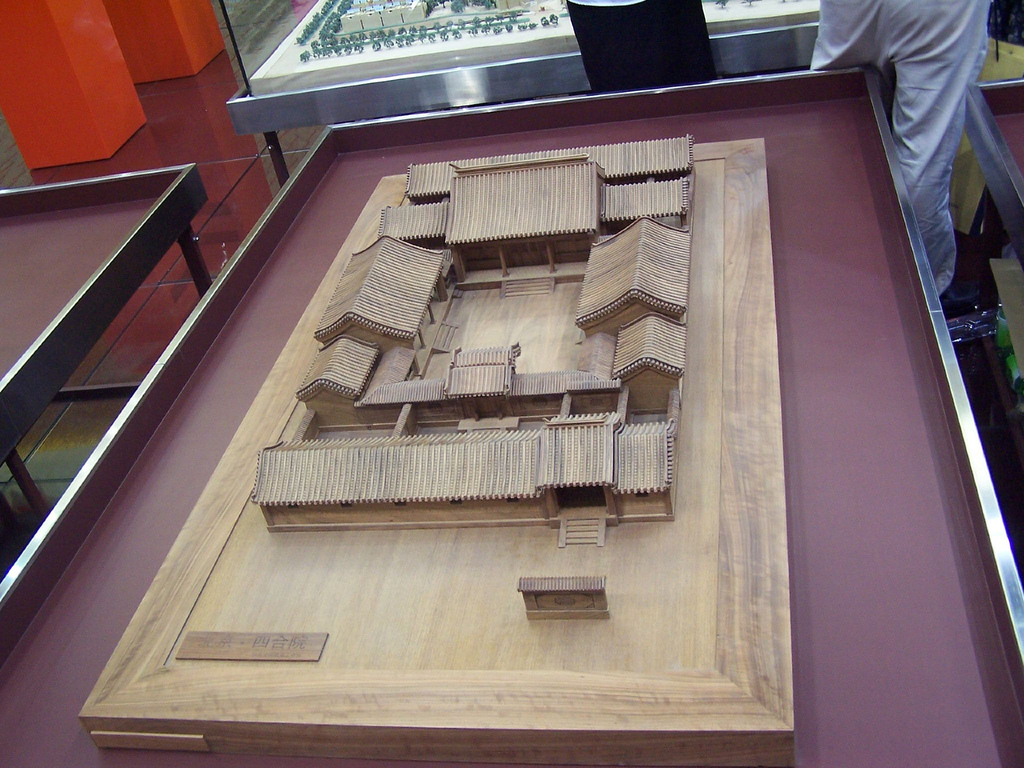
Model of a Chinese Siheyuan in Beijing, which shows off the symmetry, enclosed heavy platform and a large roof that floats over this base, with the vertical walls not as well emphasized.

Chinese architecture used concepts from Chinese cosmology such as feng shui (geomancy) and Taoism to organize construction and layout. These include:

- Screen walls to face the main entrance, which stems from the belief that evil things travel in straight lines.
- Talismans and imagery of good fortune:
  - Door gods displayed on doorways to ward off evil and encourage good fortune
  - Three anthropomorphic figures representing Fu Lu Shou (福祿壽 fú-lù-shòu) stars are prominently displayed, sometimes with the proclamation "the three stars are present" (三星宅 sān-xīng-zhài)
  - Animals and fruits that symbolize good fortune and prosperity, such as bats and pomegranates, respectively. The association is often done through rebuses.
- Orienting the structure with its back to an elevated landscape and placing water in the front.
- Ponds, pools, wells, and other water sources are built into the structure.
- Aligning a building along a north–south axis, with the building facing south (in the north where the wind is coldest in winter). The two sides face east and west respectively. The back of the structure is generally windowless.

The use of certain colors, numbers and the cardinal directions reflected the belief in a type of immanence, where the nature of a thing could be wholly contained in its own form.

Beijing and Chang'an are examples of traditional Chinese town planning that represent these cosmological concepts.

== Architectural types ==
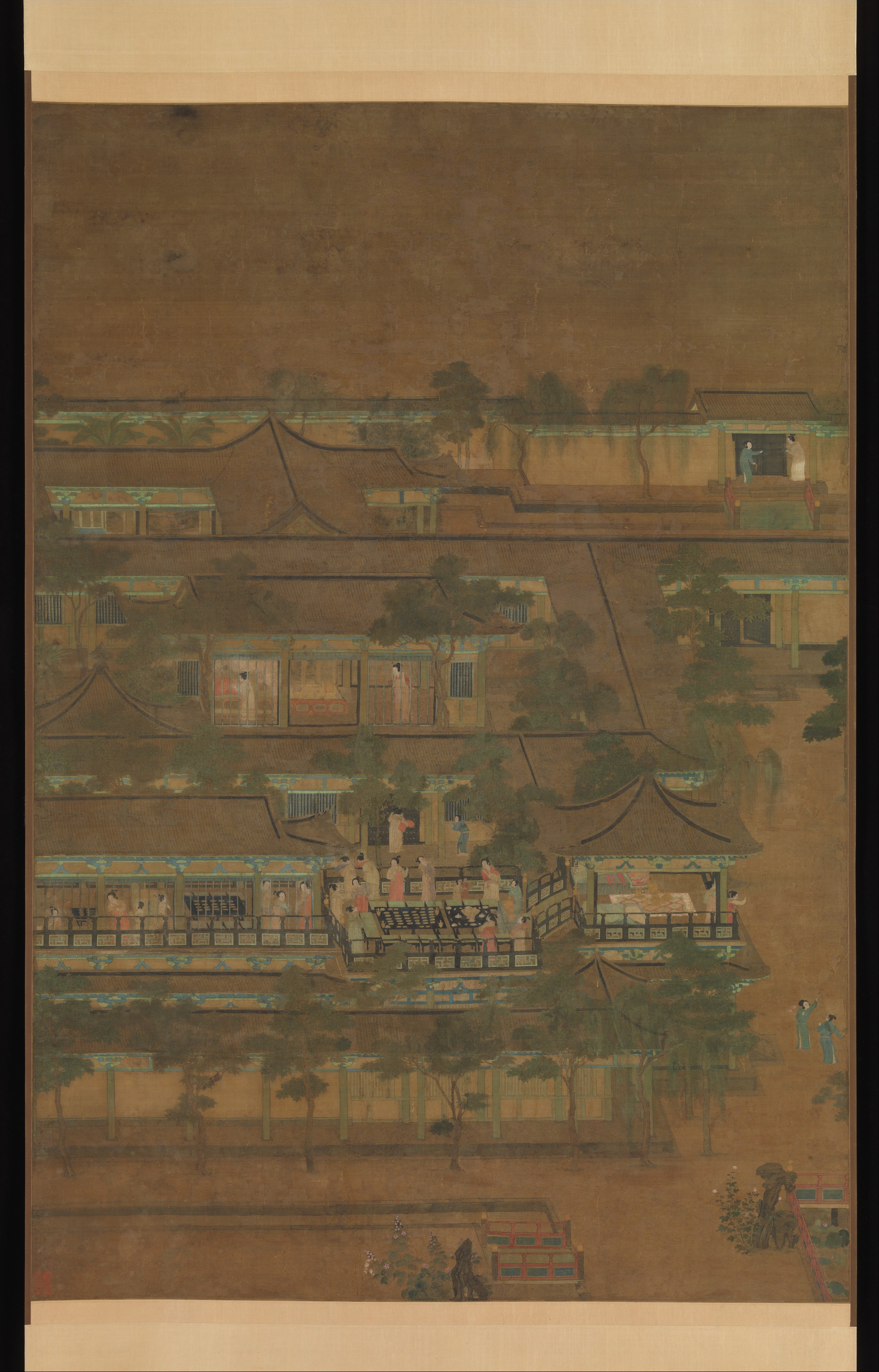
10th century painting depicting a mansion, Five Dynasties and Ten Kingdoms period

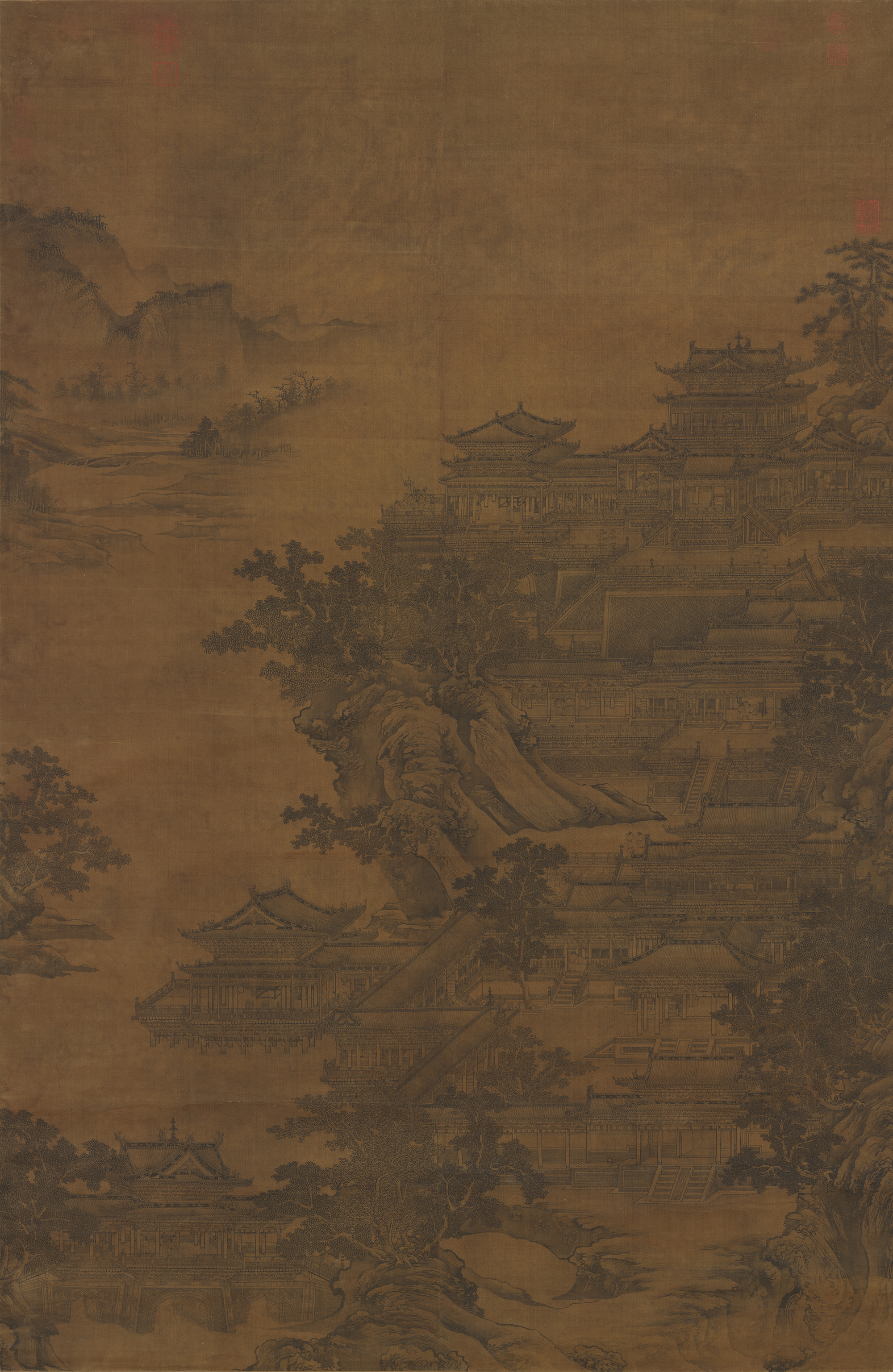
Han yuan tu by Li Rongjin, Yuan dynasty

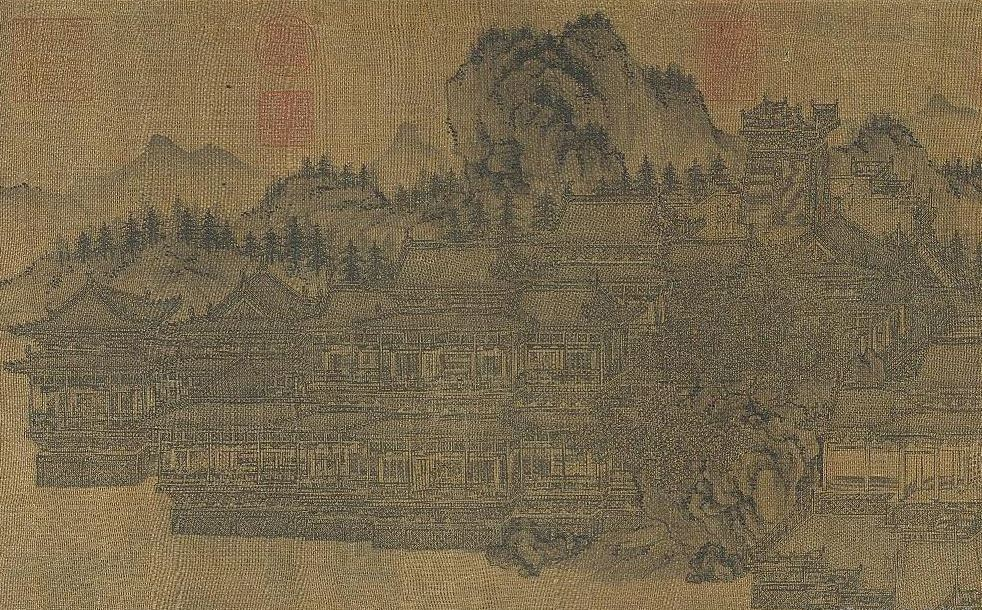
Jianzhang Palace, Yuan dynasty

The types of Chinese architecture may relate to the use of the structures, such as whether they were built for royals, commoners, or the religious.

=== Commoners ===
Due to primarily wooden construction and poor maintenance, far fewer examples of commoner's homes survive compared to those of nobles. Korman claimed the average commoner's home did not change much, even centuries after the establishment of the universal style: early-20th-century homes were similar to late and mid-imperial homes.

These homes tended to follow a set pattern: the center of the building was a shrine for deities and ancestors, and was also used during festivities. On its two sides were bedrooms for elders; the two wings (known as "guardian dragons") were for junior members, as well as the living room, the dining room, and the kitchen, although sometimes the living room was close to the center.

Sometimes the extended families became so large that one or two extra pairs of "wings" had to be built. This produced a U-shape, with a courtyard suitable (e.g., for farm work). Merchants and bureaucrats preferred to close off the front with an imposing gate. All buildings were legally regulated, and the law required that the number of stories, the length of the building and the building colours reflect the owner's class.

Some commoners living in areas plagued by bandits built communal fortresses called Tulou for protection. Often favoured by the Hakka in Fujian and Jiangxi, the design of Tulou shows the ancient philosophy of harmony between people and environment. People used local materials, often building the walls with rammed earth. No window reached the outside on the lower two floors (for defense), but the inside included a common courtyard and let people gather.

=== Imperial ===
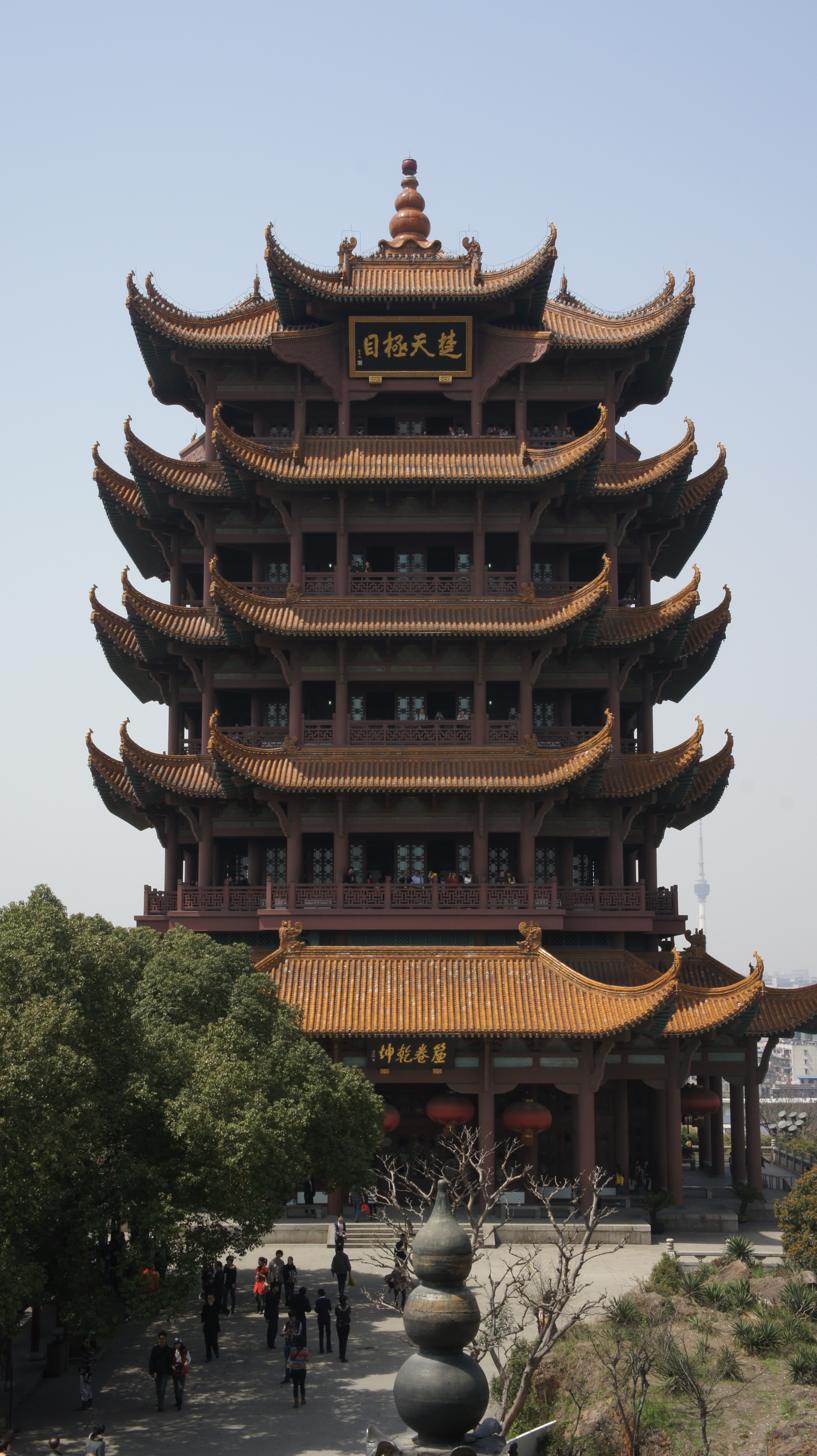
The modern Yellow Crane Tower, rebuilt in 1985.

Certain architectural features were reserved for buildings built for the emperor of China. One example is the use of yellow (the imperial color) roof tiles. Yellow tiles still adorn most of the buildings within the Forbidden City. Only the emperor could use hip roofs, with all four sides sloping. The two types of hip roof were single-eave and double-eave. The Hall of Supreme Harmony is the archetypal example of double eaves. The Temple of Heaven uses blue roof tiles to symbolize the sky. The roofs are almost invariably supported by brackets ("dougong"), a feature shared only with the largest of religious buildings. The building's wooden columns well as the wall surfaces, tend to be red. Black is often used in pagodas. It was believed that the gods were inspired by the black color to visit earth.

The 5-clawed dragon, adopted by the Hongwu emperor (first emperor of Ming dynasty) for his personal use, was used to decoration the beams, pillars, and on the doors on imperial architecture. Curiously, the dragon was never used on roofs of imperial buildings.

Only buildings used by the imperial family were allowed to have nine jian (間, space between two columns); only gates used by the emperor could have five arches, with the centre one, reserved for the emperor. The ancient Chinese favored the color red.

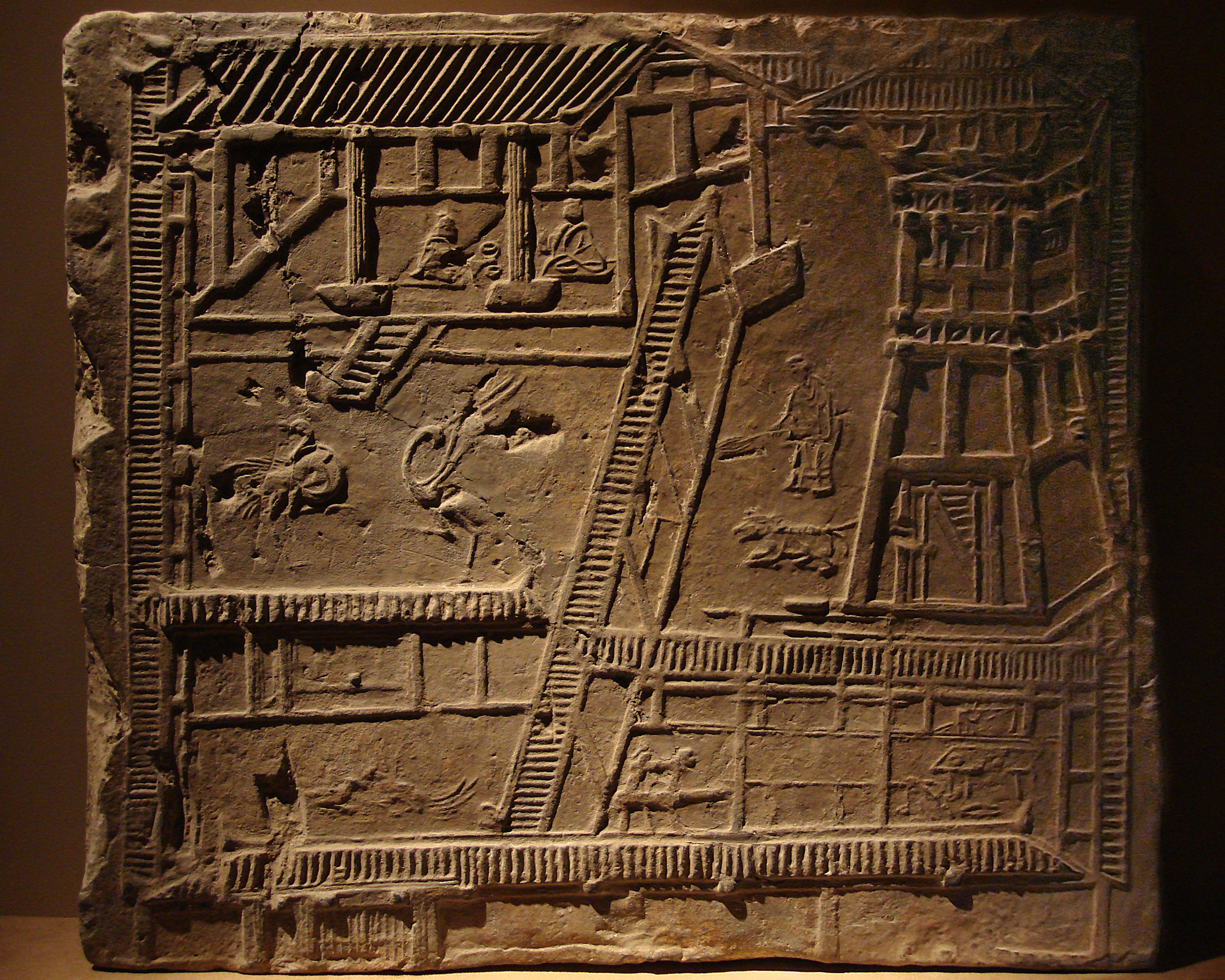
Pictorial brick depicting a typical Han-style palatial courtyard with watchtowers.

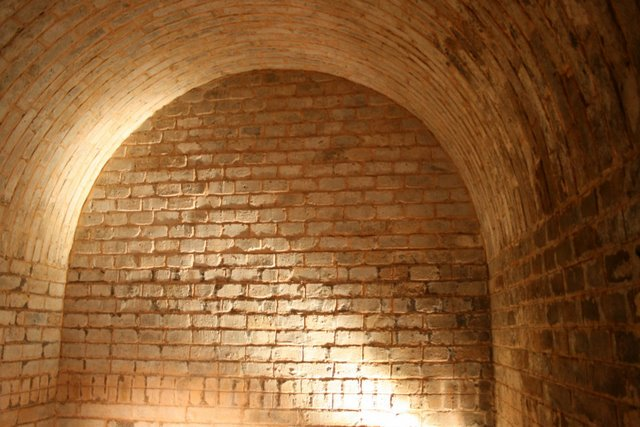
A vaulted tomb chamber in Luoyang, built during the Eastern Han dynasty (AD 25–220)

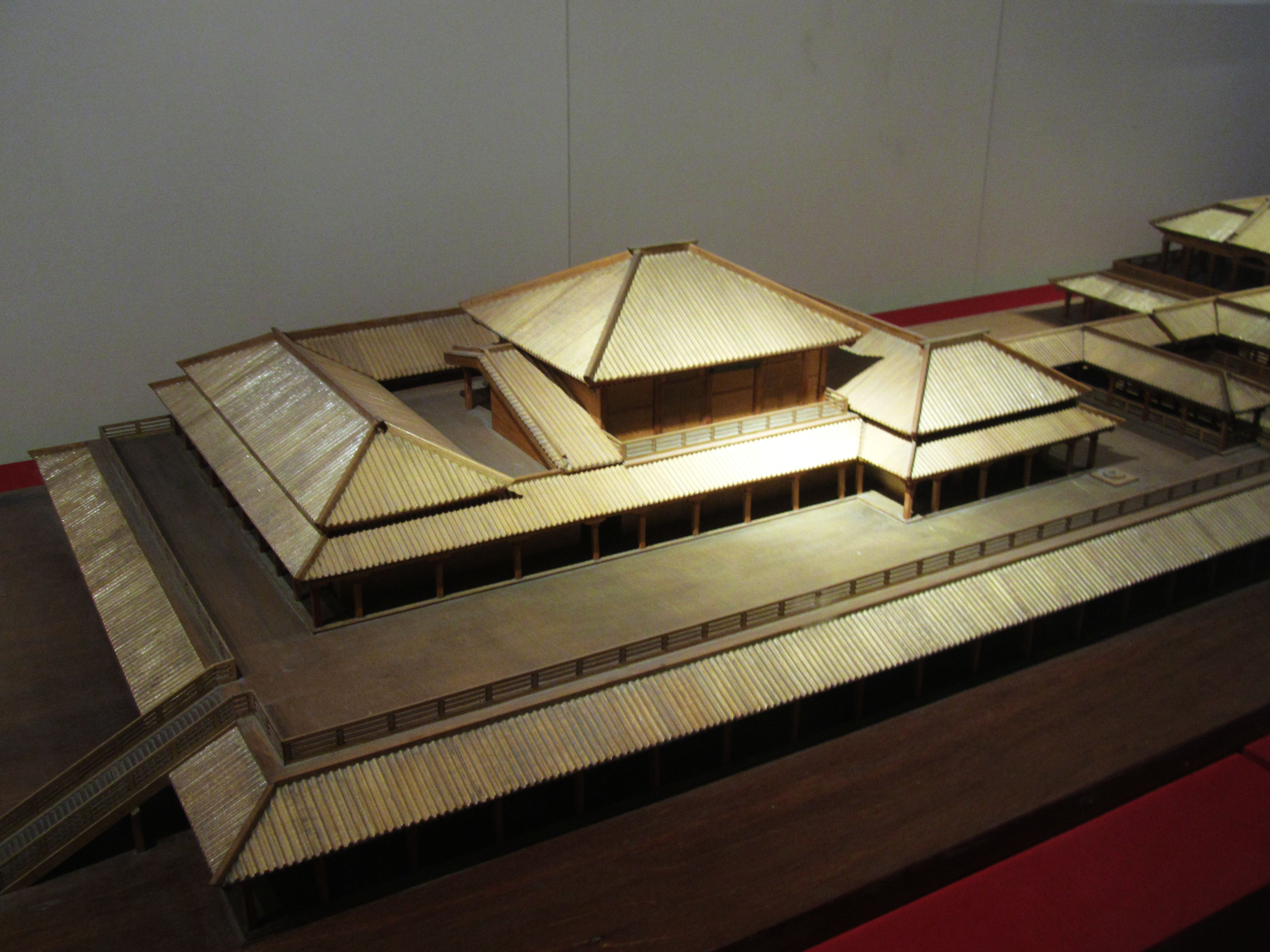
Model of Xianyang Palace; Qin state, Warring States c.5th century BCE

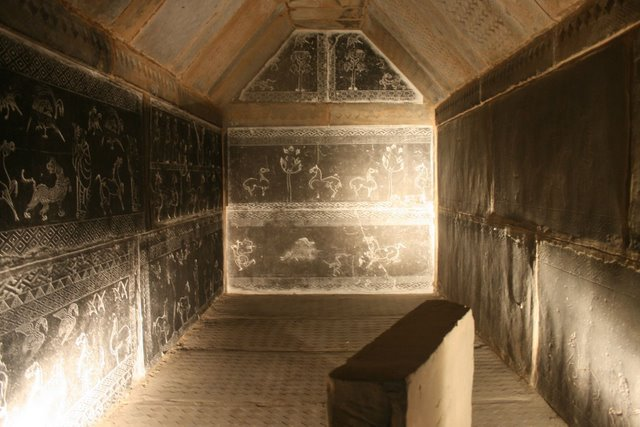
A tomb chamber of Luoyang, built during the Eastern Han dynasty (AD 25–220) with incised wall decorations

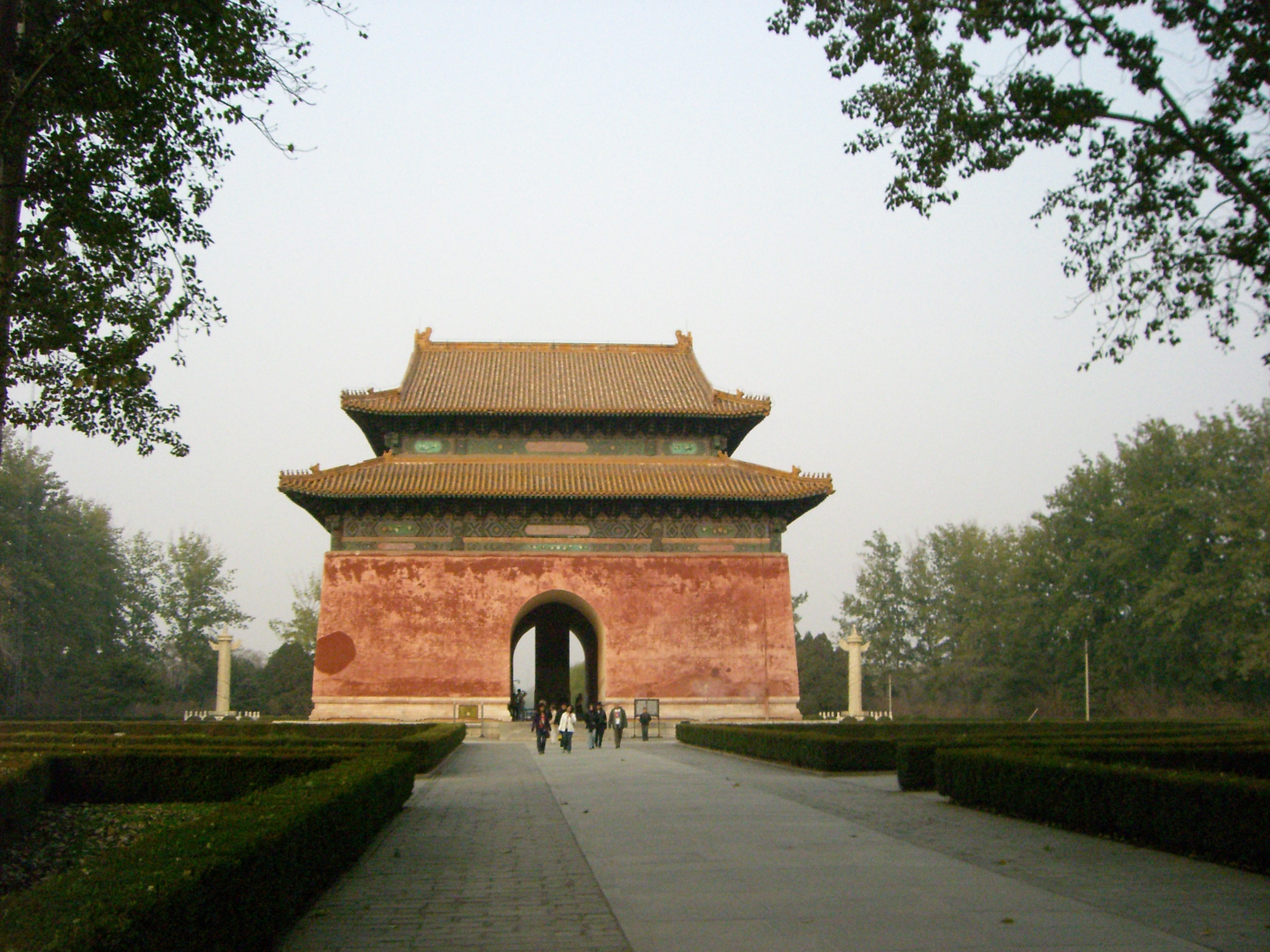
The Great Red Gate at the Ming tombs near Beijing, built in the 15th century

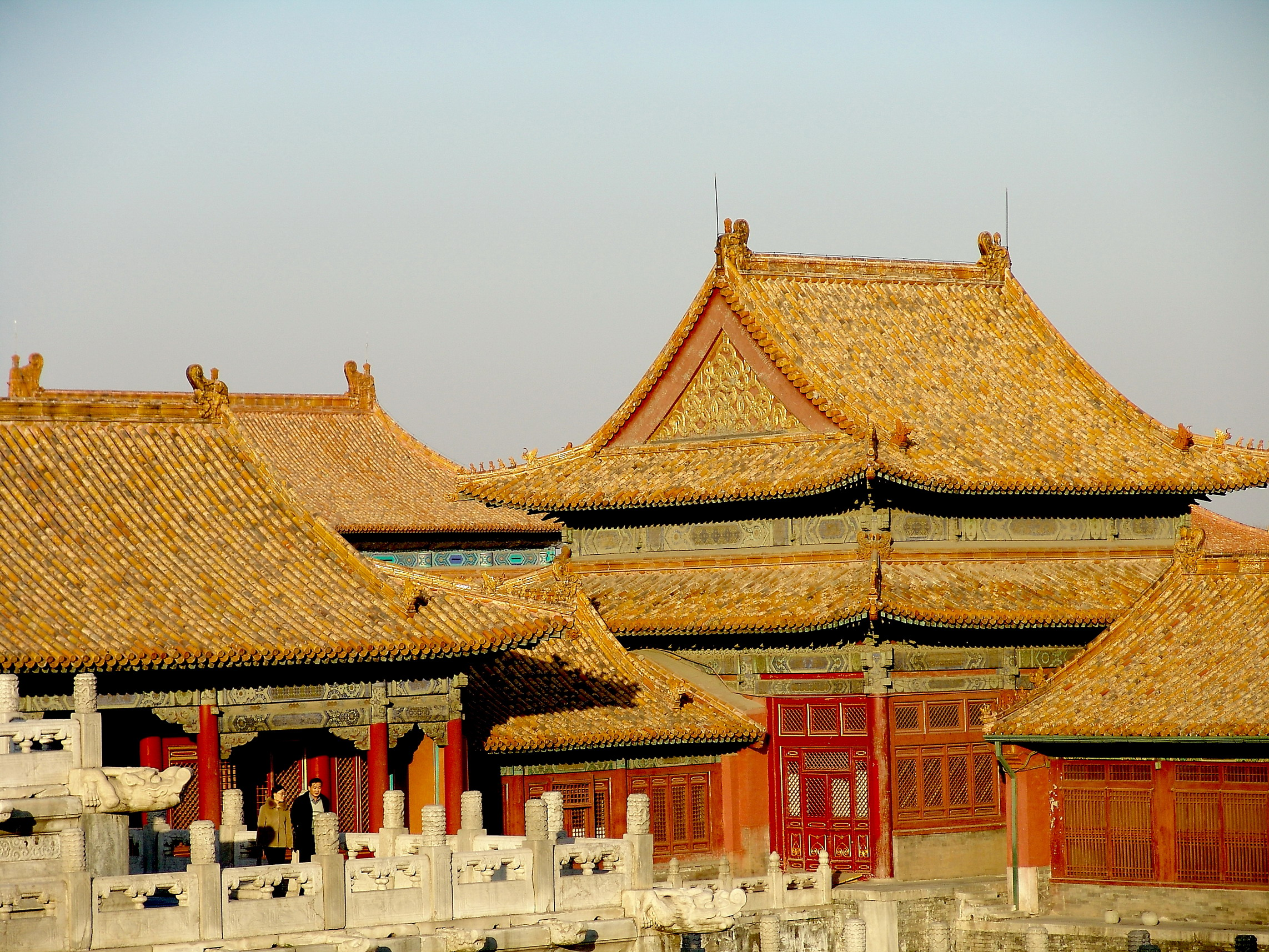
The yellow roof tiles and red wall in the Forbidden City (Palace Museum) grounds in Beijing, built during the Yongle era (1402–1424) of the Ming dynasty

Beijing became the capital of China after the Mongol invasion of the 13th century, completing the easterly migration of the Chinese capital begun in the Jin dynasty. The Ming uprising in 1368 reasserted Chinese authority and fixed Beijing as the seat of imperial power for the next five centuries. The emperor and the empress lived in palaces on the central axis of the Forbidden City, the crown prince at the eastern side, and the concubines at the back (the imperial concubines were often referred to as "The Back Palace Three Thousand"). During the mid-Qing dynasty, the emperor's residence was moved to the western side of the complex. It is misleading to speak of an axis in the Western sense of a visual perspective ordering facades. The Chinese axis is a line of privilege, usually built upon, regulating access—instead of vistas, a series of gates and pavilions are used.

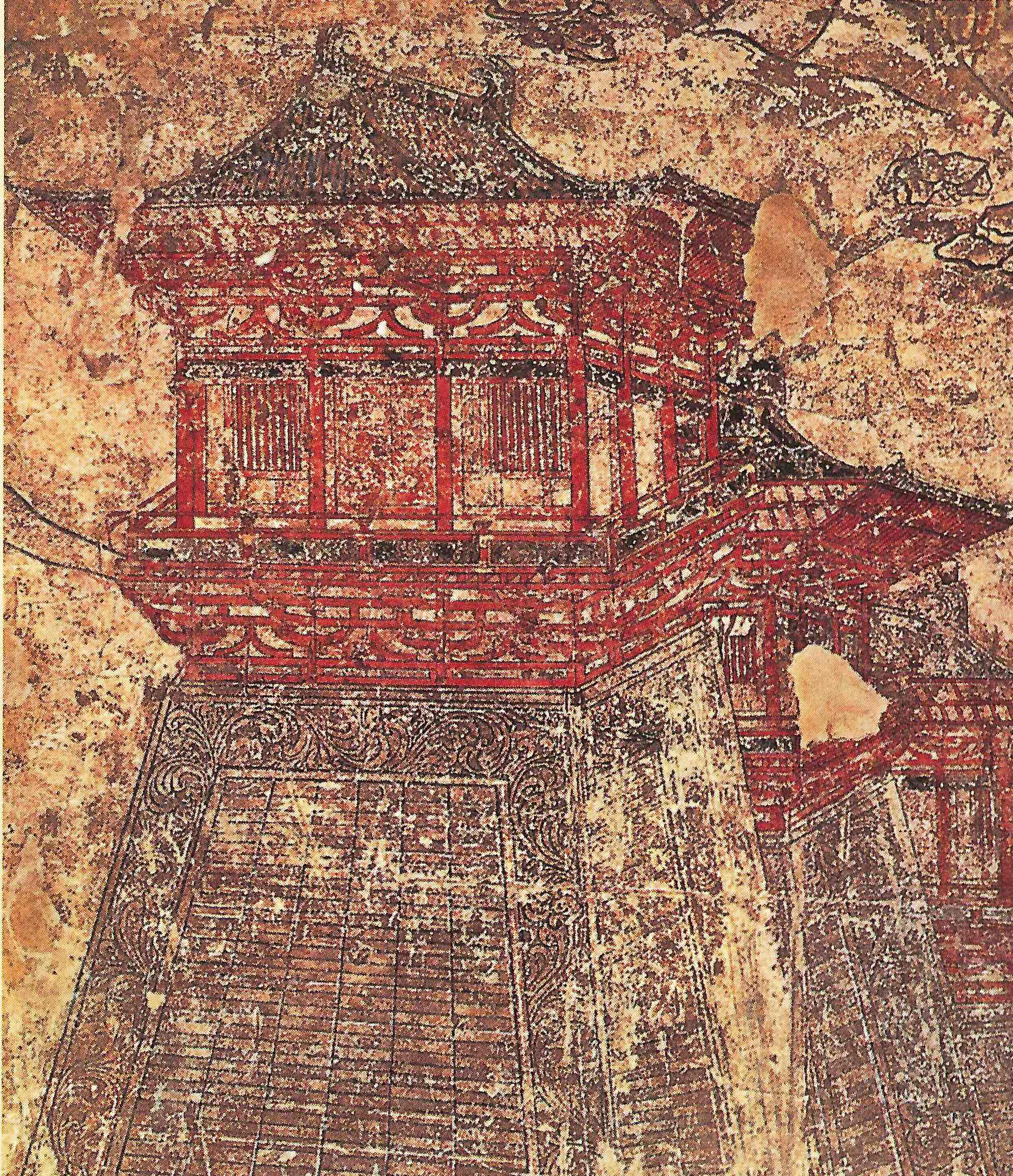
Que 闕 towers along the walls of Tang-era Chang'an, as depicted in this 8th-century mural from Prince Li Chongrun's tomb at the Qianling Mausoleum in Shaanxi

Numerology influenced imperial architecture, hence the use of nine (the greatest single digit number) in much of construction and the reason why the Forbidden City in Beijing is said to have 9,999.9 rooms—just short of heaven's mythical 10,000 rooms. The importance of the East (the direction of the rising sun) in orienting and siting imperial buildings is a form of solar worship found in many ancient cultures, reflecting the affiliation of Ruler with the Sun.

The tombs and mausoleums of imperial family members, such as the 8th-century Tang dynasty tombs at the Qianling Mausoleum, can be counted as part of the imperial tradition. These above-ground earthen mounds and pyramids had subterranean shaft-and-vault structures that were lined with brick walls since at least the Warring States period (481–221 BC).

=== Religious ===
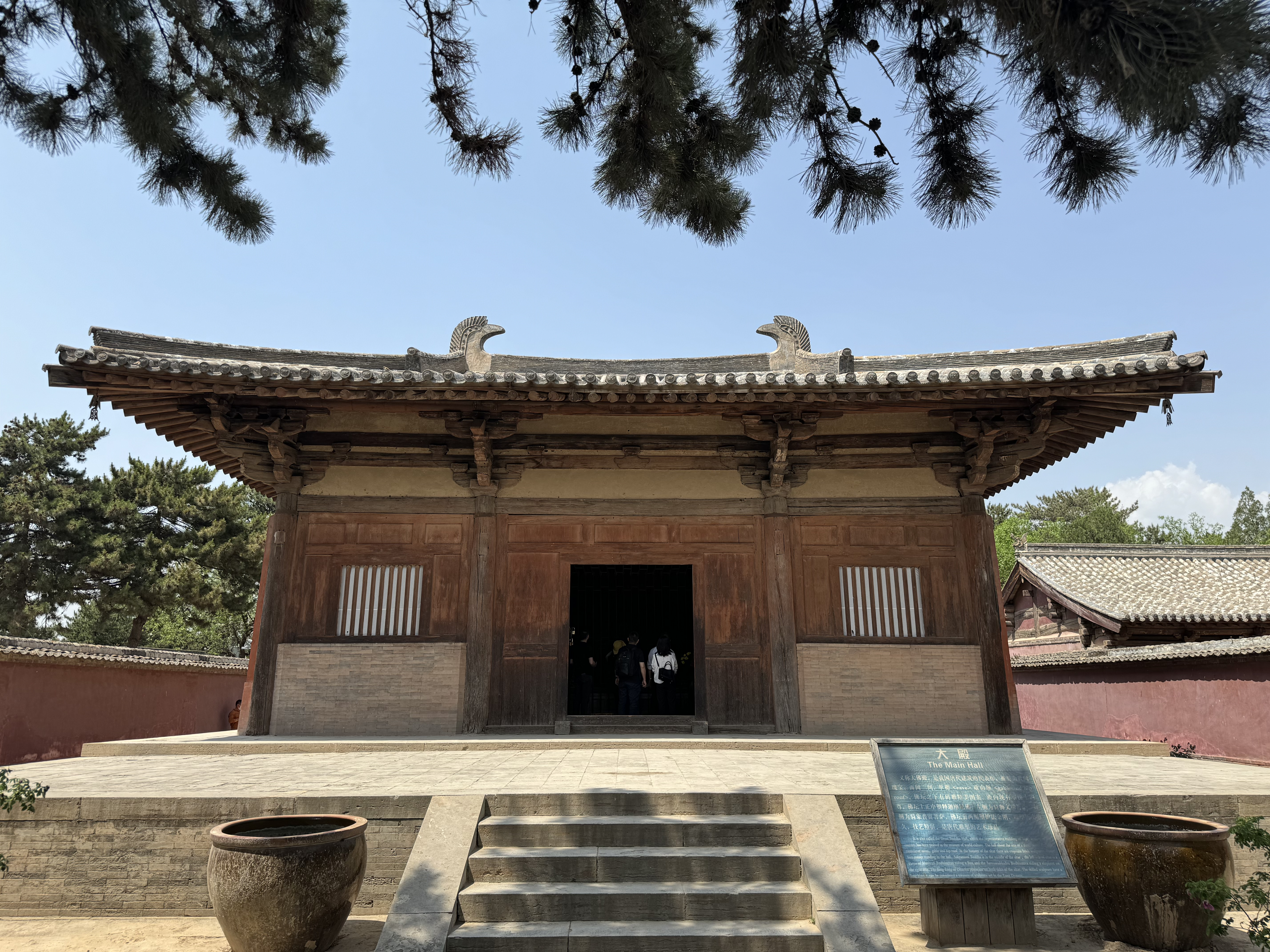
Nanchan Temple (Wutai), built in the late 8th century during the Tang dynasty

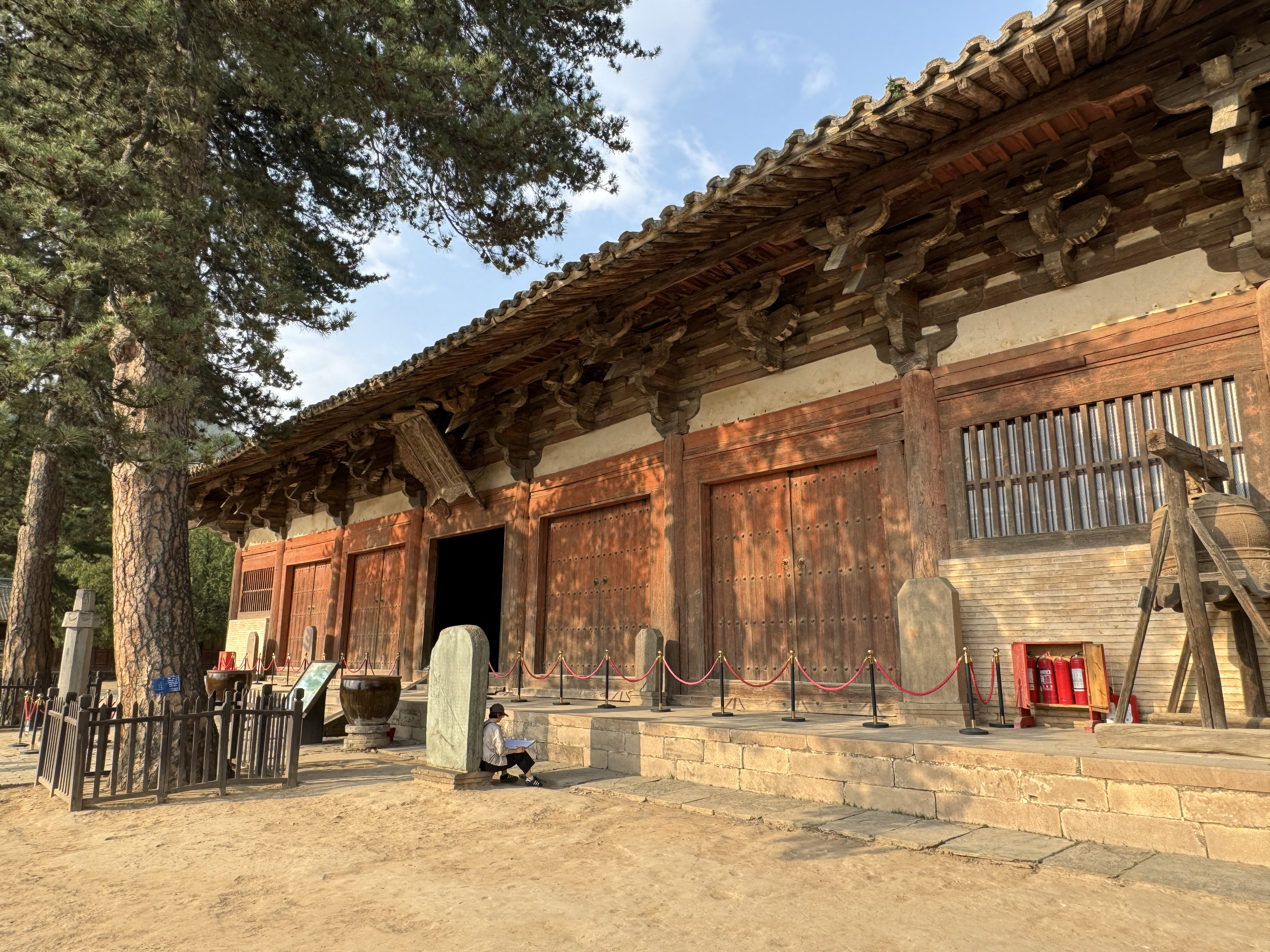
A timber hall built in 857 during the Tang dynasty, located at the Buddhist Foguang Temple of Mount Wutai, Shanxi

Generally speaking, Buddhist architecture follows the imperial style. A large Buddhist monastery normally has a front hall, housing the statues of the Four Heavenly Kings, followed by a great hall, housing statues of the Buddhas. Accommodations are located at the two sides. Some of the greatest examples of this come from the 18th-century Puning Temple and Putuo Zongcheng Temple. Buddhist monasteries sometimes also have pagodas, which may house relics of the Gautama Buddha; older pagodas tend to be four-sided, while later pagodas usually have eight sides.

Daoist architecture usually follows the commoners' style. The main entrance is, however, usually at the side, out of superstition about demons that might try to enter the premise (see feng shui.) In contrast to the Buddhists, in a Daoist temple the main deity is located in the main hall at the front, with lesser deities in the back hall and at the sides. This is because Chinese people believe that even after the body has died, the soul is still alive. From the Han grave design, it shows the forces of cosmic yin/yang, the two forces from the heaven and earth that create eternity.

The tallest pre-modern building in China was built for both religious and martial purposes. The Liaodi Pagoda of 1055 AD stands at a height of 84 m (276 ft), and although it served as the crowning pagoda of the Kaiyuan monastery in old Dingzhou, Hebei, it was also used as a military watchtower for Song dynasty soldiers to observe potential Liao dynasty troop movements.

The architecture of the mosques and gongbei tomb shrines of Chinese Muslims often combines traditional Chinese styles with Middle Eastern influences. The royal and nonroyal tombs found in the third through sixth centuries traced back to Han construction. Some tombs were considered two-chamber spaces, where the focal point was the central pagoda pillar. This focal point served as what Buddhist call a pagoda, which is a symbol of the Buddha and his death. The layout of such tombs has the corpse in the back chamber, as the pillar location indicated the Buddha's death. There would sometimes be interior tomb decoration to portray immortal or divine meaning.

Dome ceilings in the 4th and 7th centuries were representations of the heavens. This originates from Roman provincial art and ancient Egypt. As most of these representations are circular, other forms are present: dodecagon, octagonal, and square. Many caves in the 4th-7th centuries were probably carved throughout the Han and Tang period.

==== Gallery ====
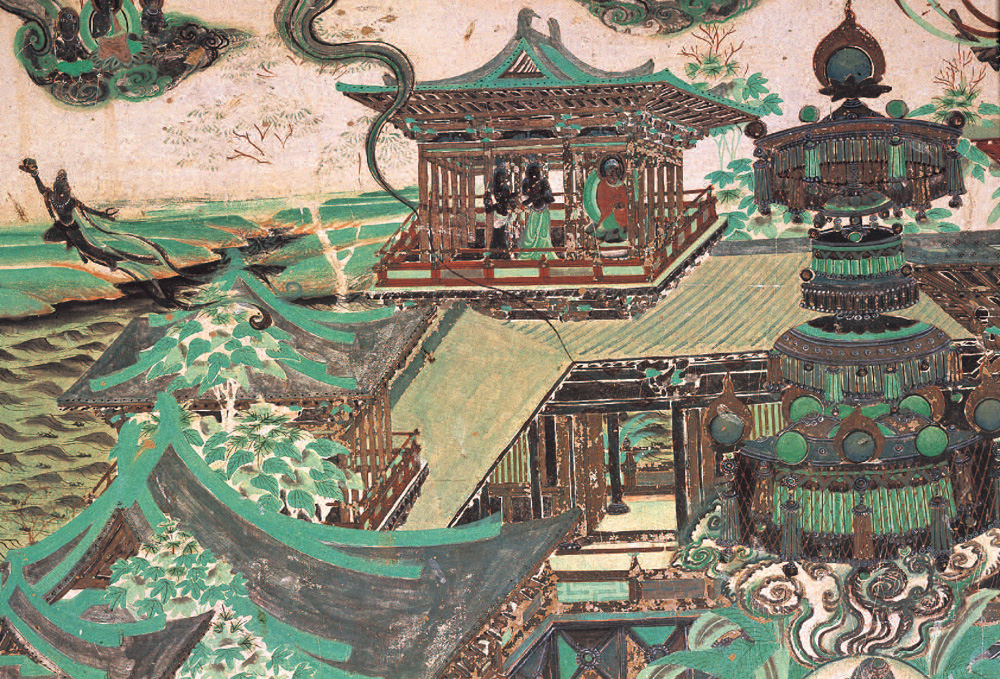
Fresco from the Mogao Cave depicting typical Tang Dynasty architecture.

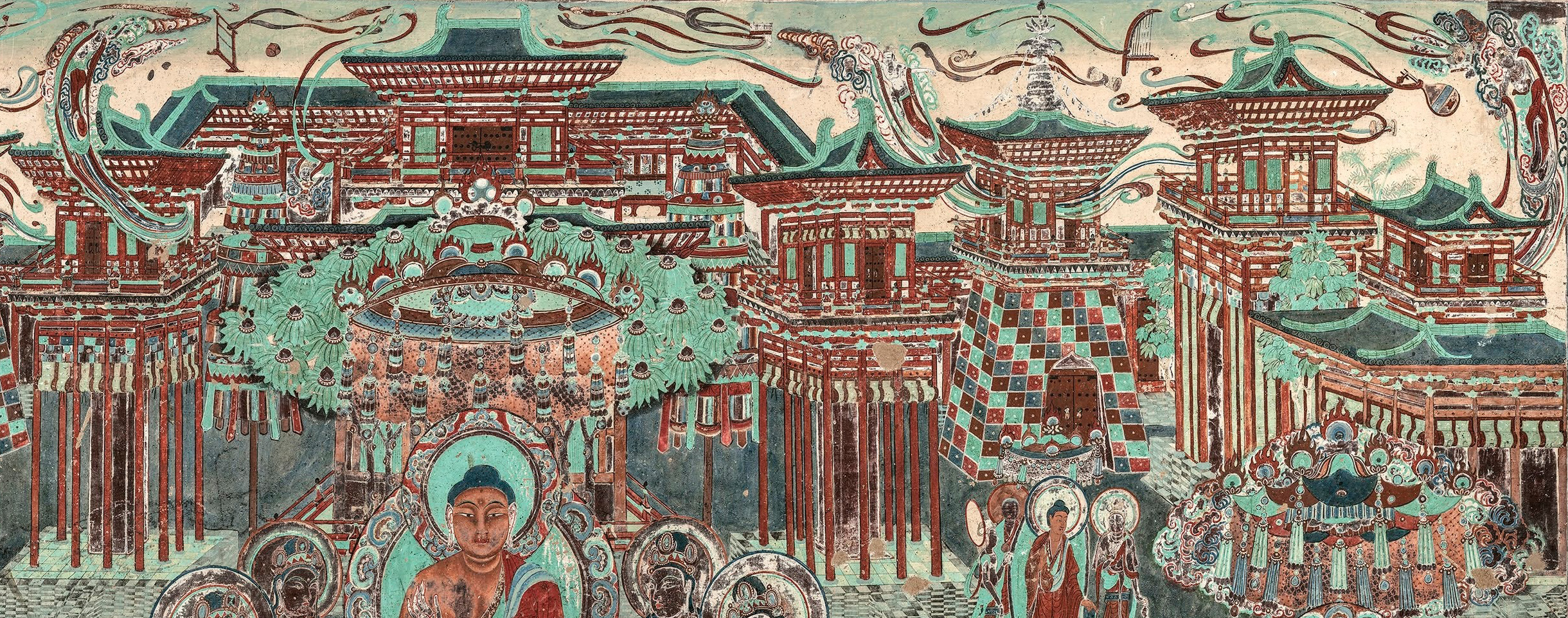
Fresco from the Mogao Cave.

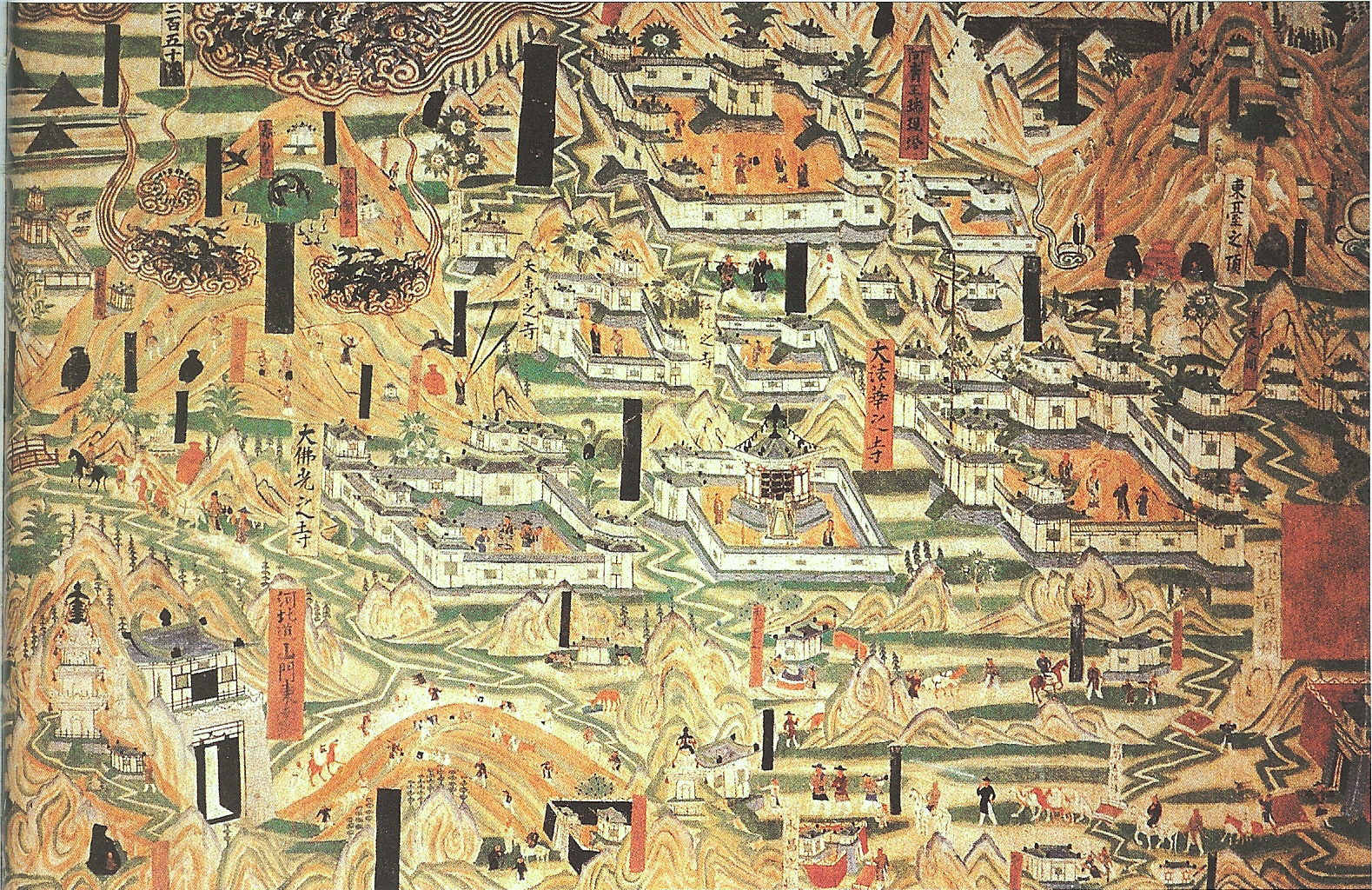
English: A mural painting from Cave 61 at the Mogao Caves, depicting Tang dynasty monastic architecture from Mount Wutai.

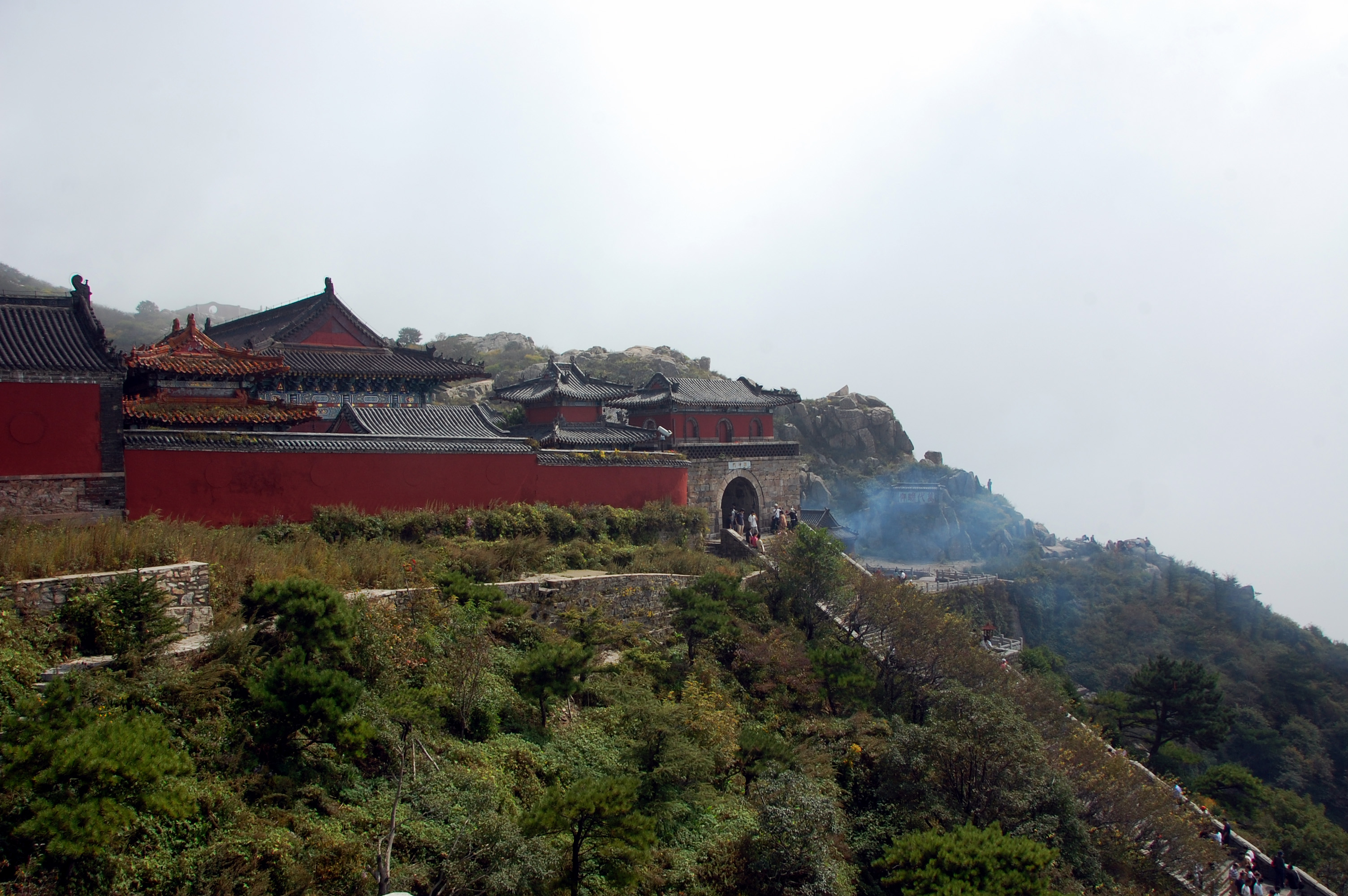
A group of temples at the top of Mount Taishan, where structures have been built at the site since the 3rd century BC during the Han dynasty

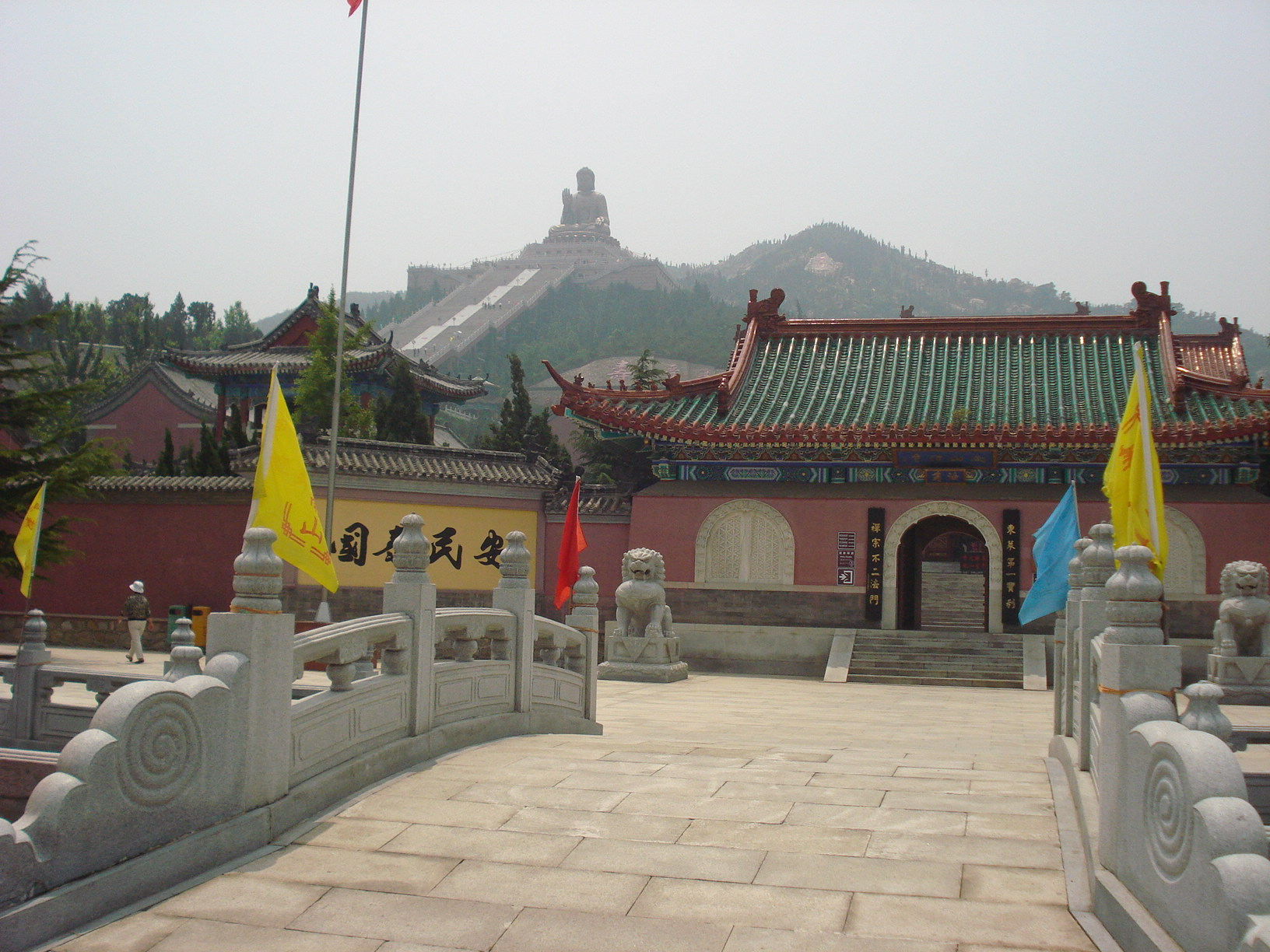
Nanshan Temple in Longkou, Shandong.

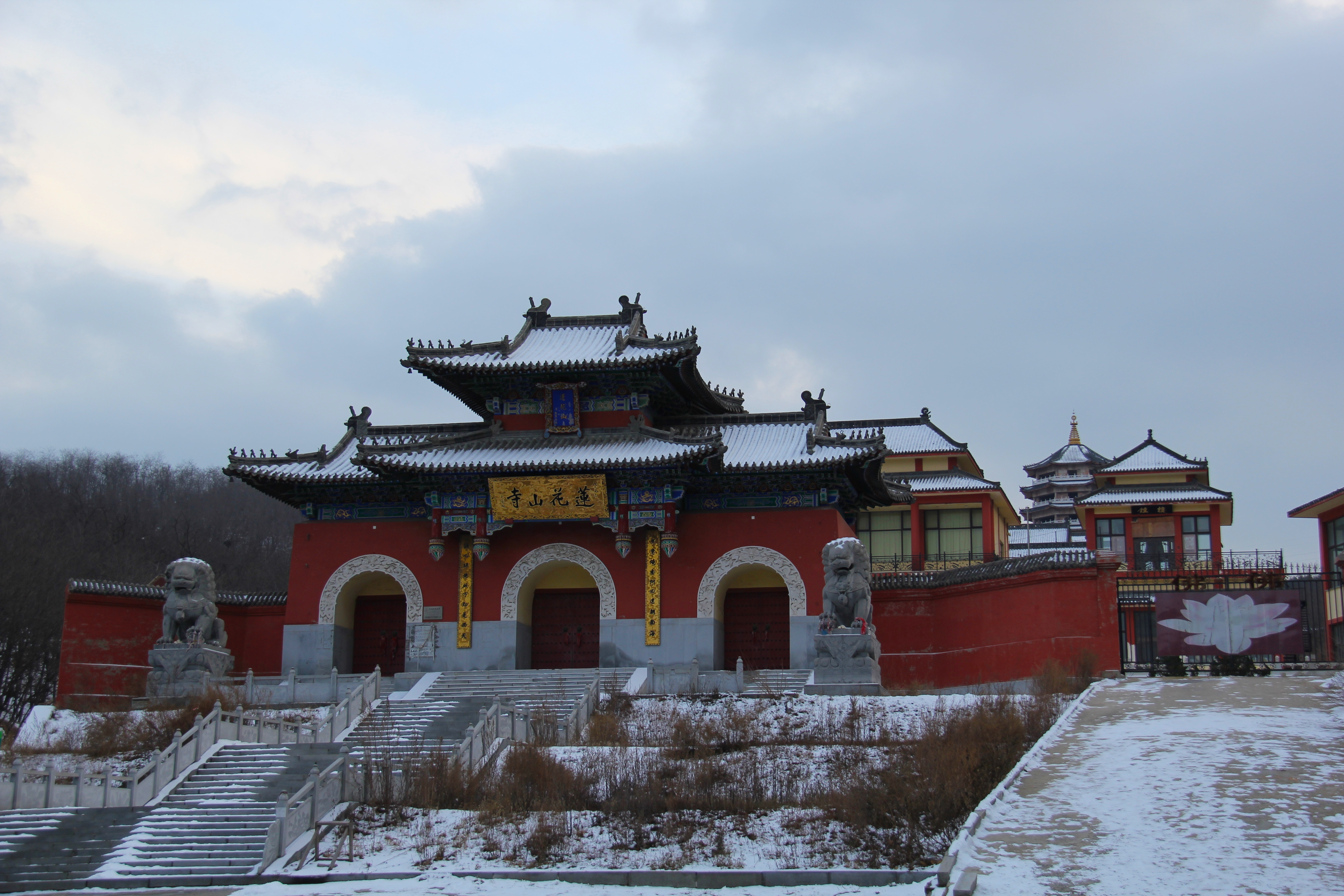
Lianhuashan (lit. "lotus flower mountain") Temple in Dalian

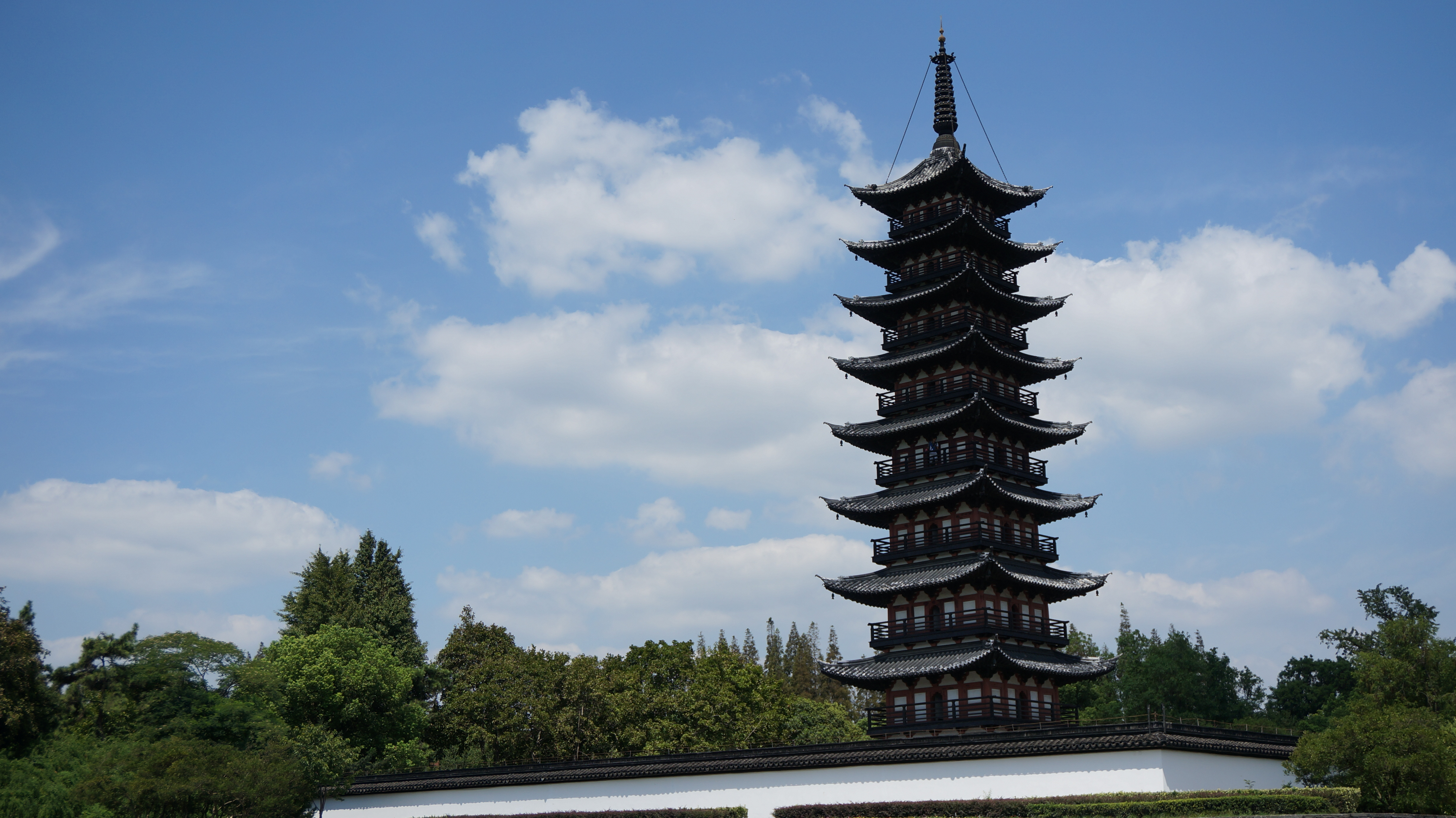
Songjiang Square Pagoda, built in the 11th century

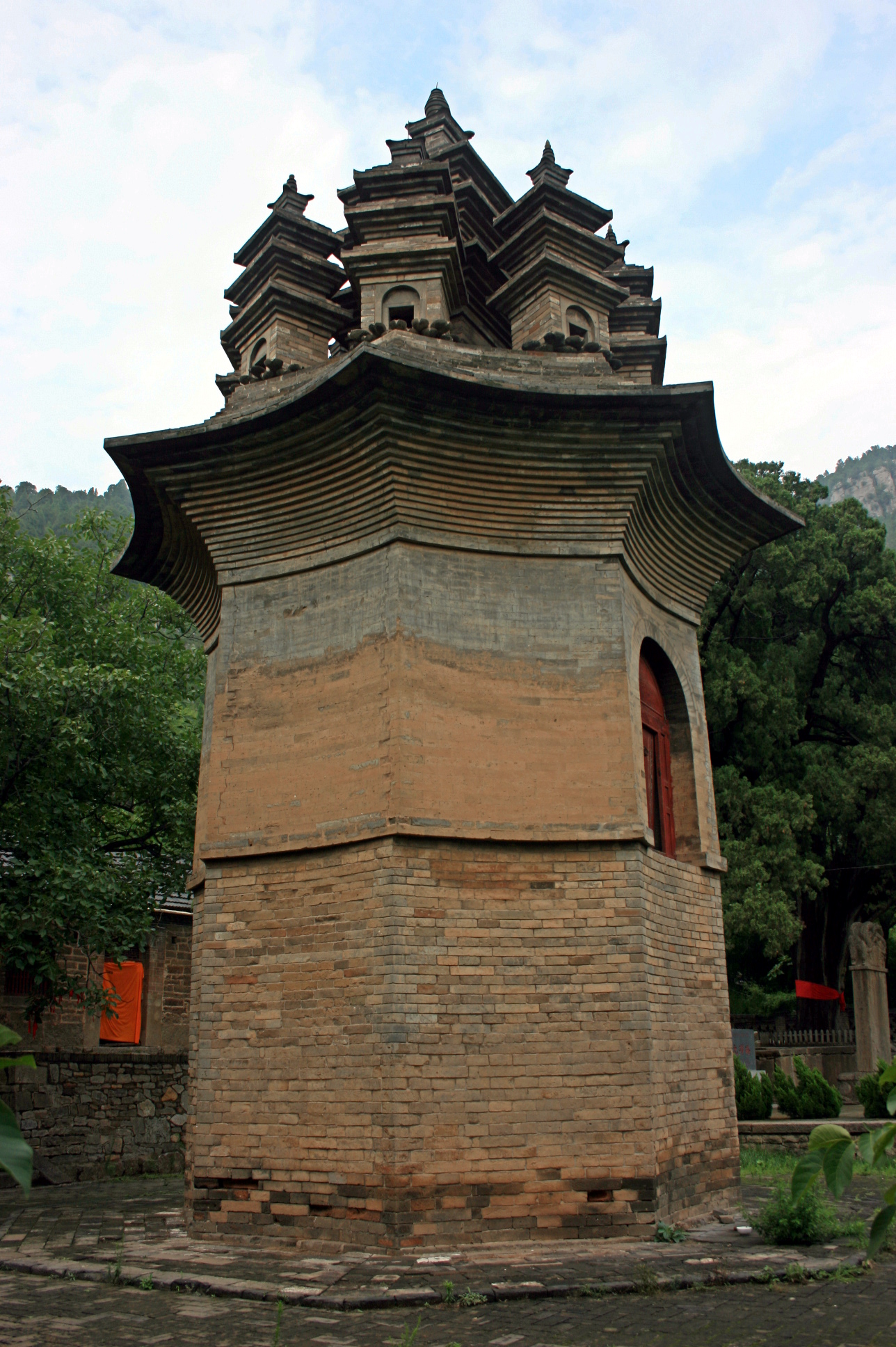
The Nine Pinnacle Pagoda, built in the 8th century during the Tang dynasty

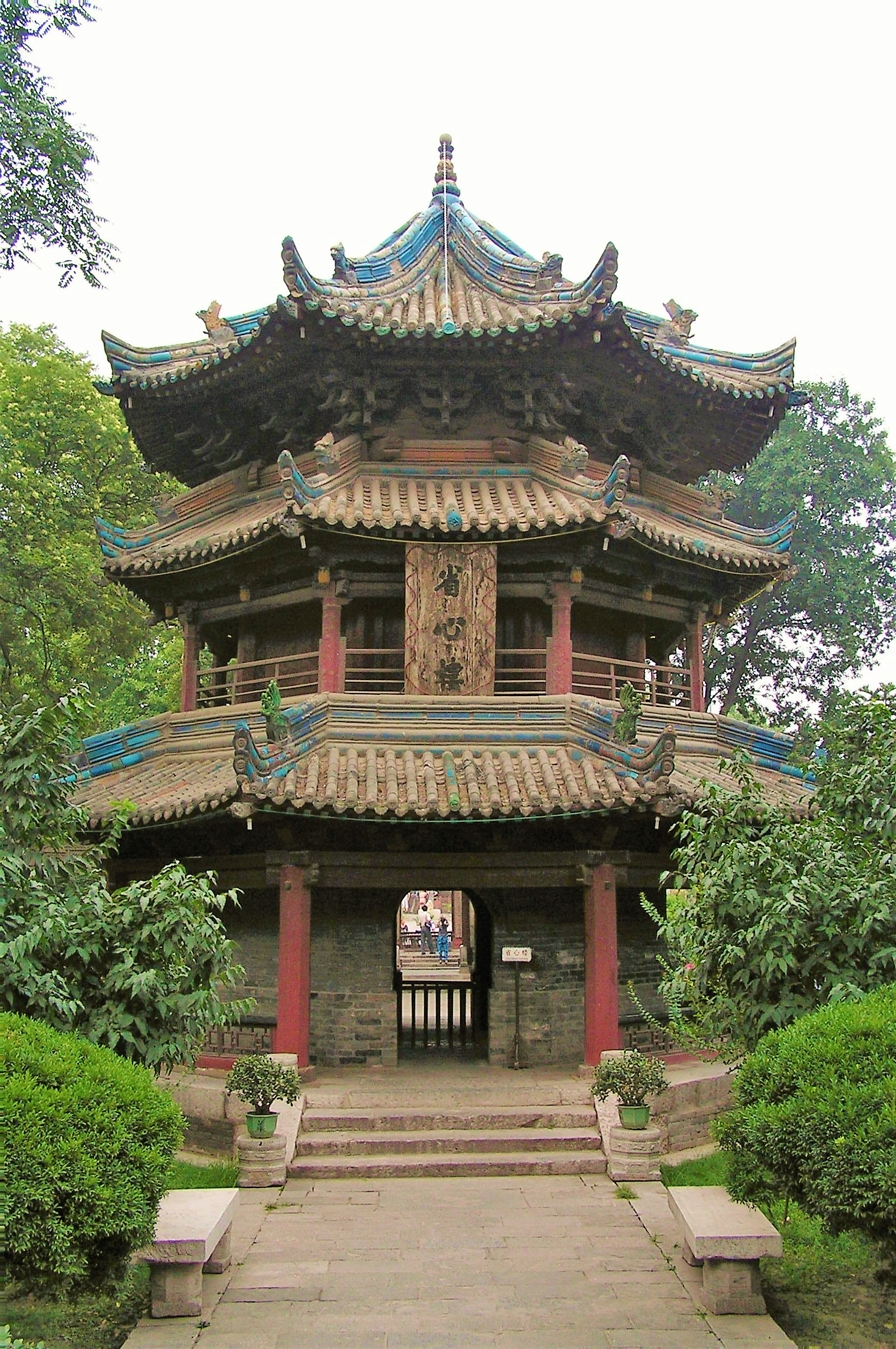
A Chinese pavilion instead of a minaret at the Great Mosque of Xi'an.

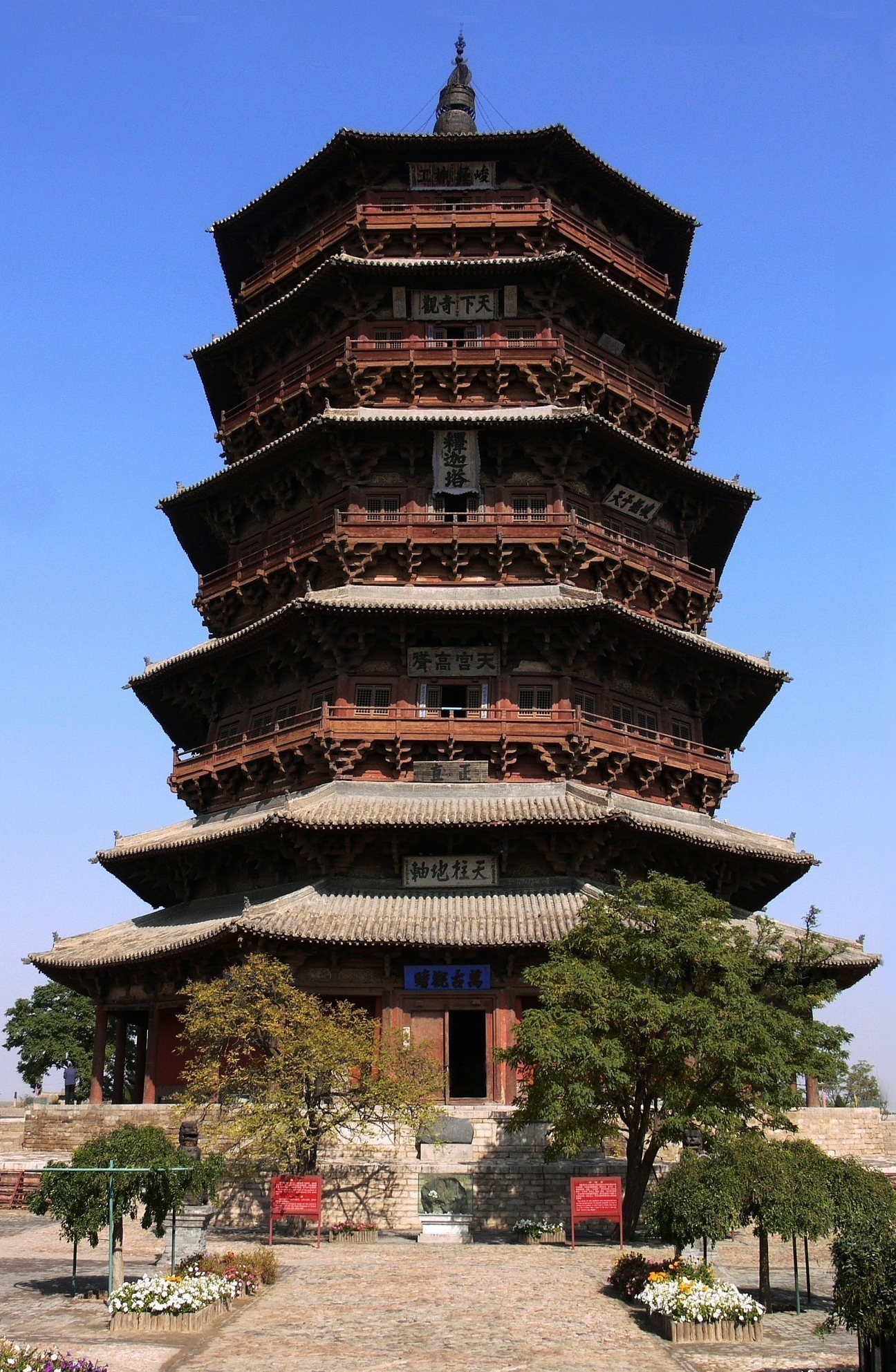
The Fogong Temple Pagoda, located in Ying county, Shanxi province, built in 1056 during the Liao dynasty, is the oldest existent fully wooden pagoda in China

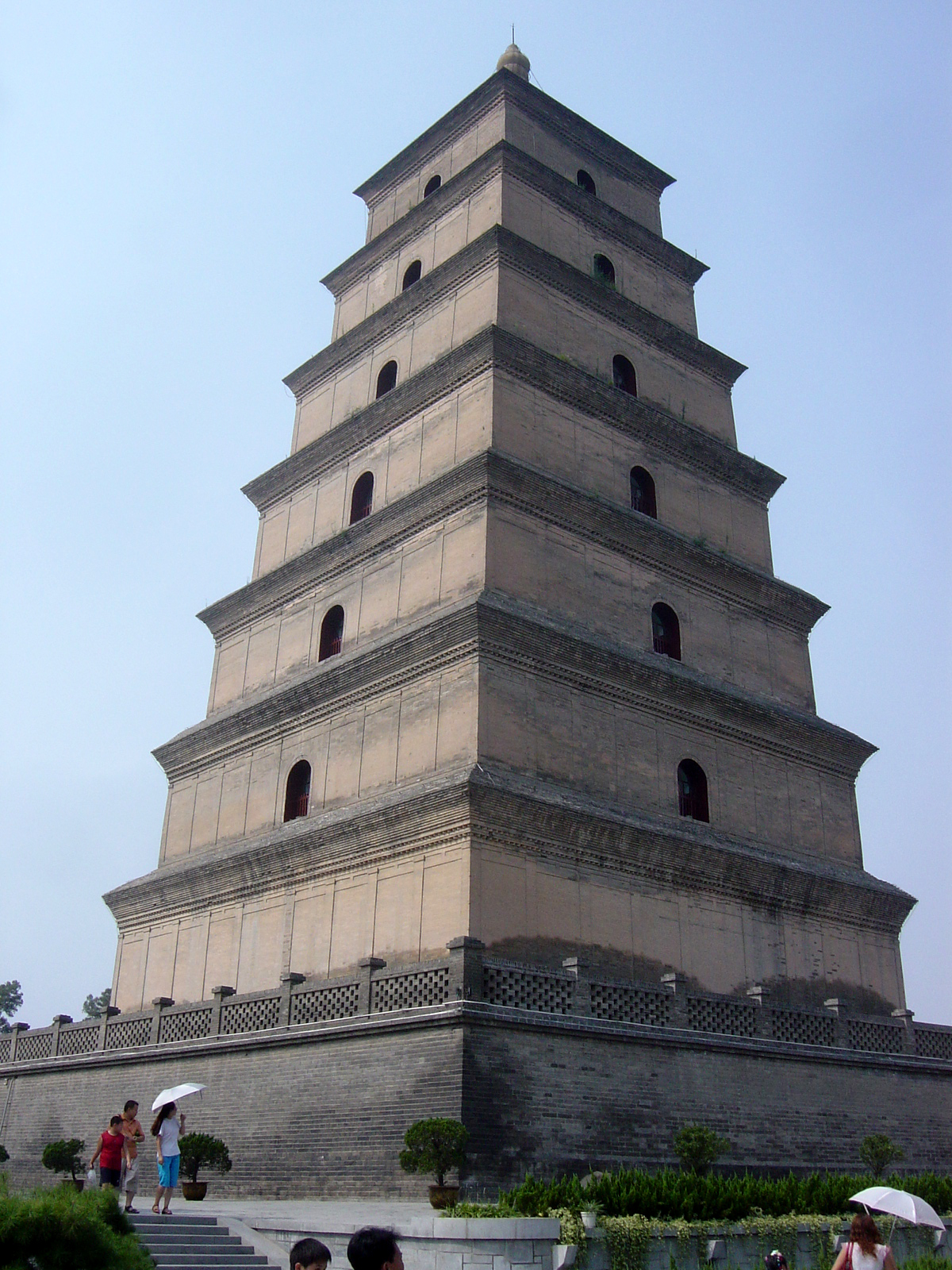
The Giant Wild Goose Pagoda in Xi'an, rebuilt in 704 during the Tang dynasty

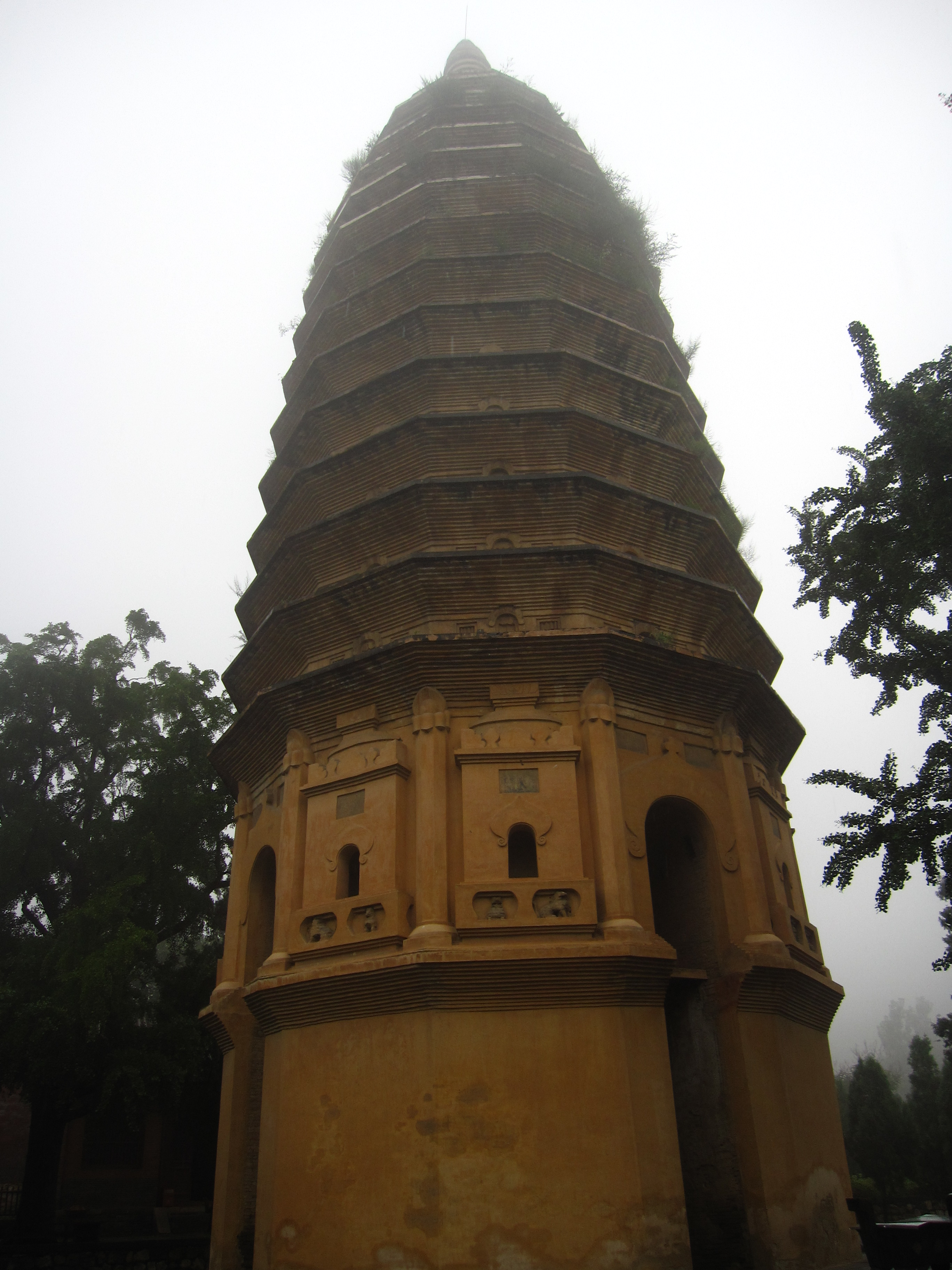
The Songyue Pagoda, built in 523 AD during the Northern and Southern dynasties

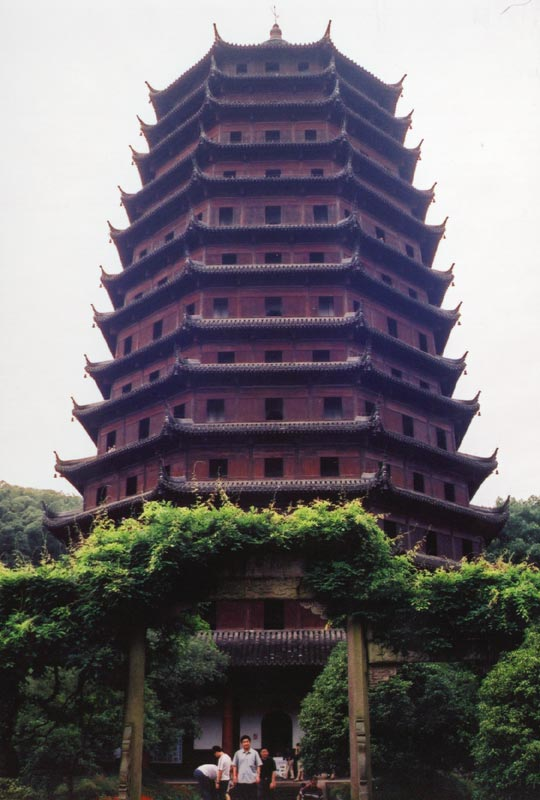
The Liuhe Pagoda of Hangzhou, China, built in 1165 AD during the Song dynasty

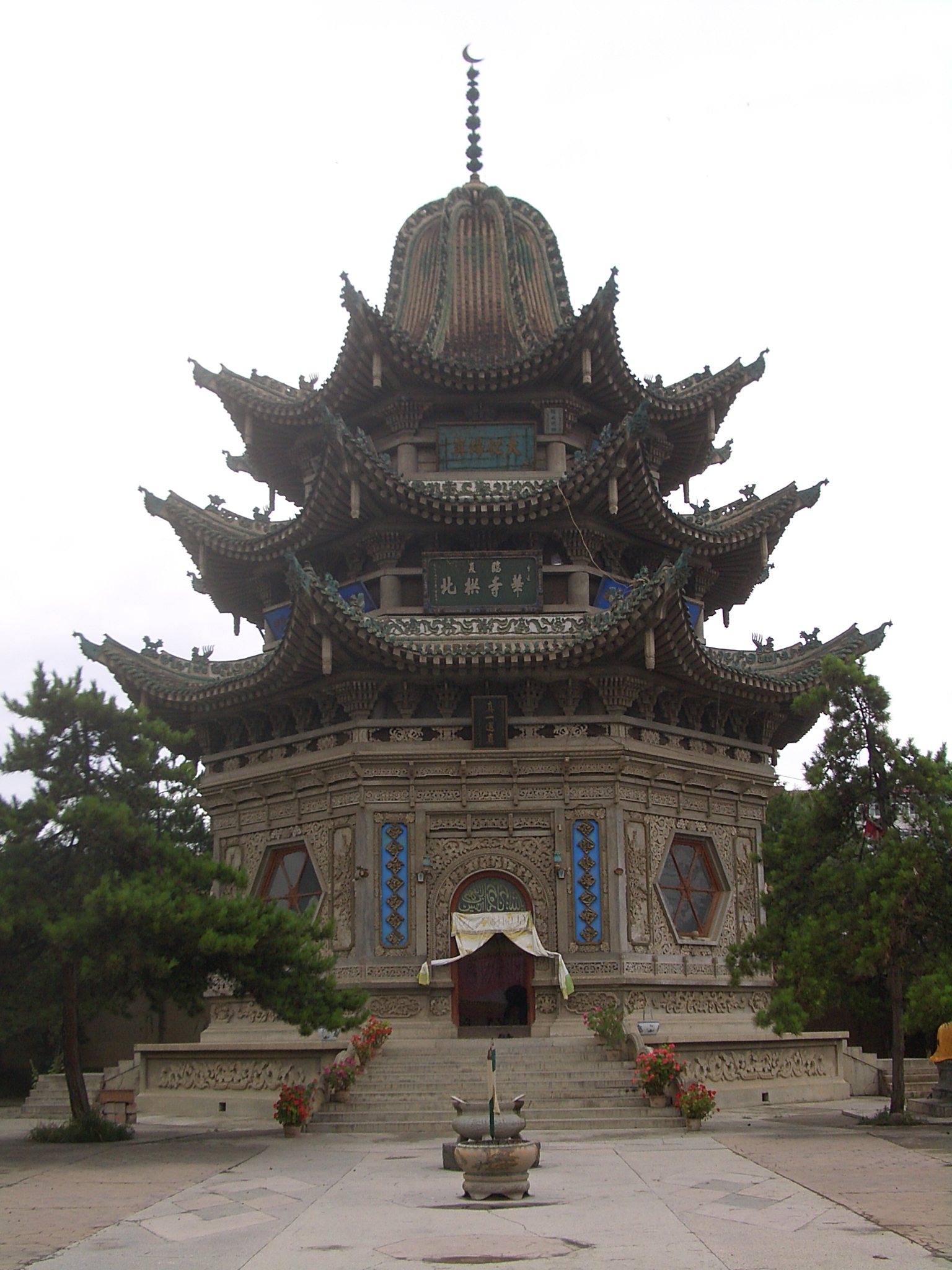
Hua Si Gongbei (the mausoleum of Ma Laichi) in Linxia City, Gansu

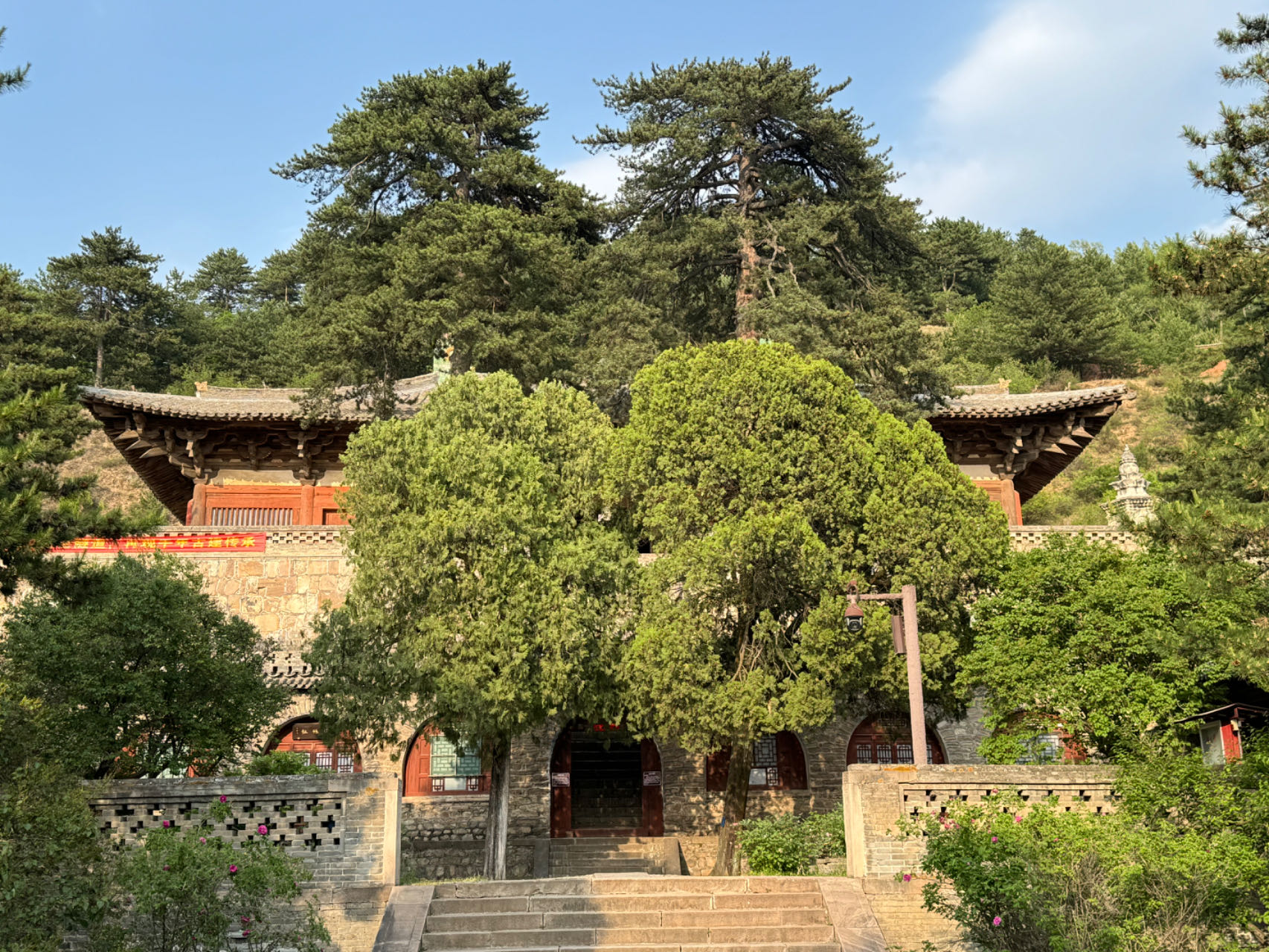
A timber hall built in 857 during the Tang dynasty, located at the Buddhist Foguang Temple in Mount Wutai, Shanxi

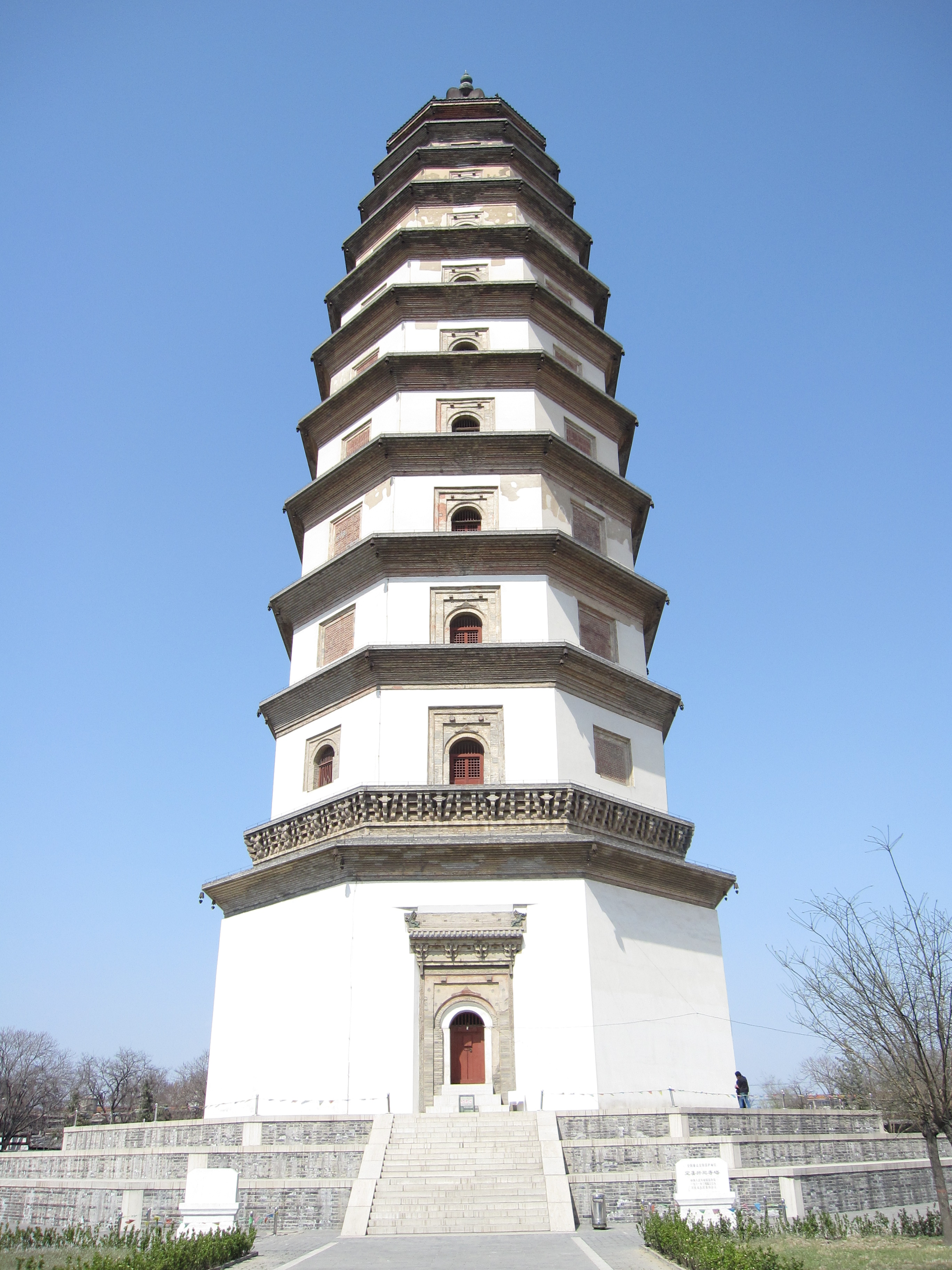
The Liaodi Pagoda, the tallest pre-modern Chinese pagoda, built in 1055 during the Song dynasty

== Urban planning ==
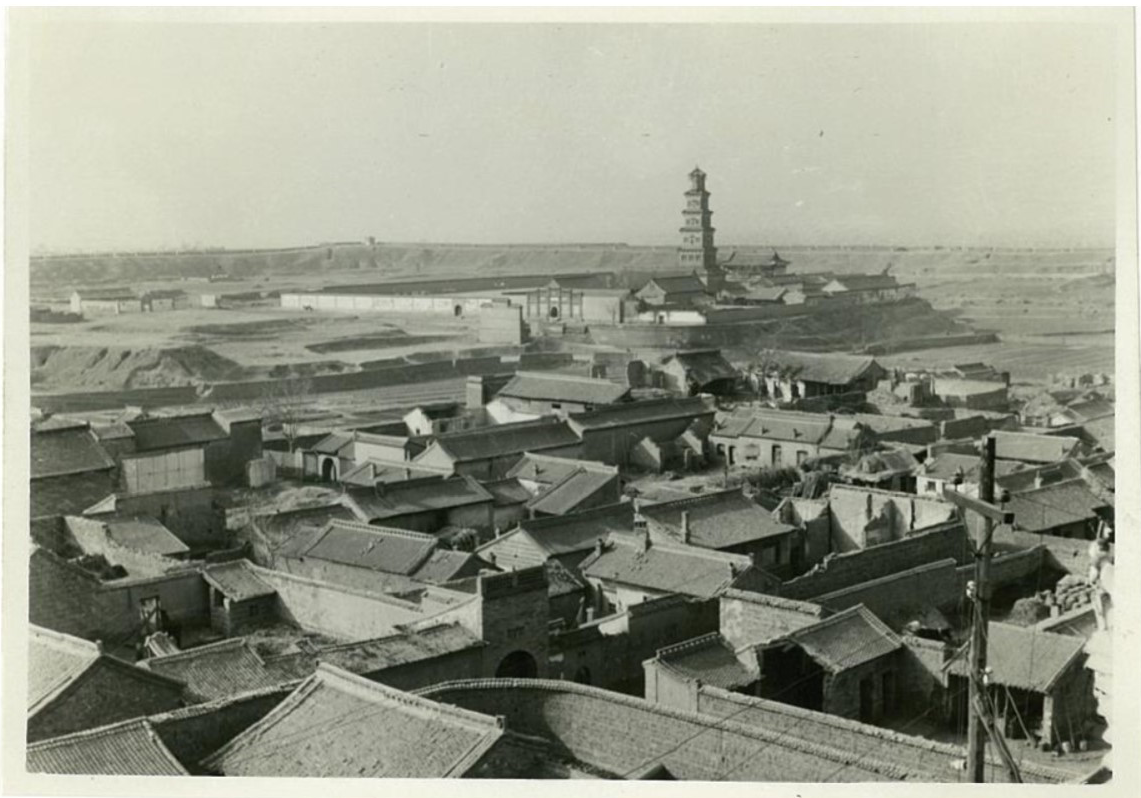
Linfen, Shanxi in 1940

Chinese urban planning is based on fengshui geomancy and the well-field system of land division, both used since the Neolithic age. The basic well-field diagram is overlaid with the luoshu, a magic square divided into 9 sub-squares, and linked with Chinese numerology. In Southern Song dynasty (1131AD), the design of Hongcun city in Anhui was based around "harmony between man and nature", facing south and surrounded by mountains and water. According to fengshui, it is a carefully planned ancient village and shows the Human-Nature Intergraded Ecological Planning concept.

Since wars were frequent in northern China, many people moved to southern China. The building method of a courtyard house was adapted to southern China. The village of Tungyuan in Fujian Province is a good example of a planned settlement that shows the feng shui elements – psychological self-defense and building structure – in the form of material self-defense.

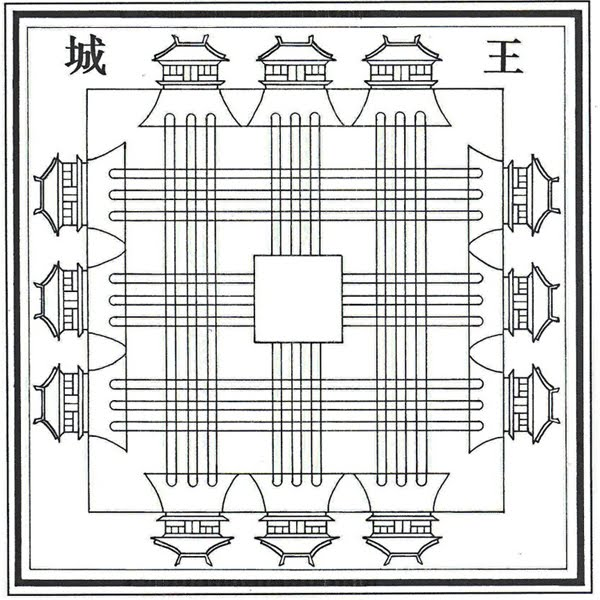
Plan of Chengzhou from the 1175 Song-era Xinding Sanlitu

== Construction ==
=== Materials and history ===
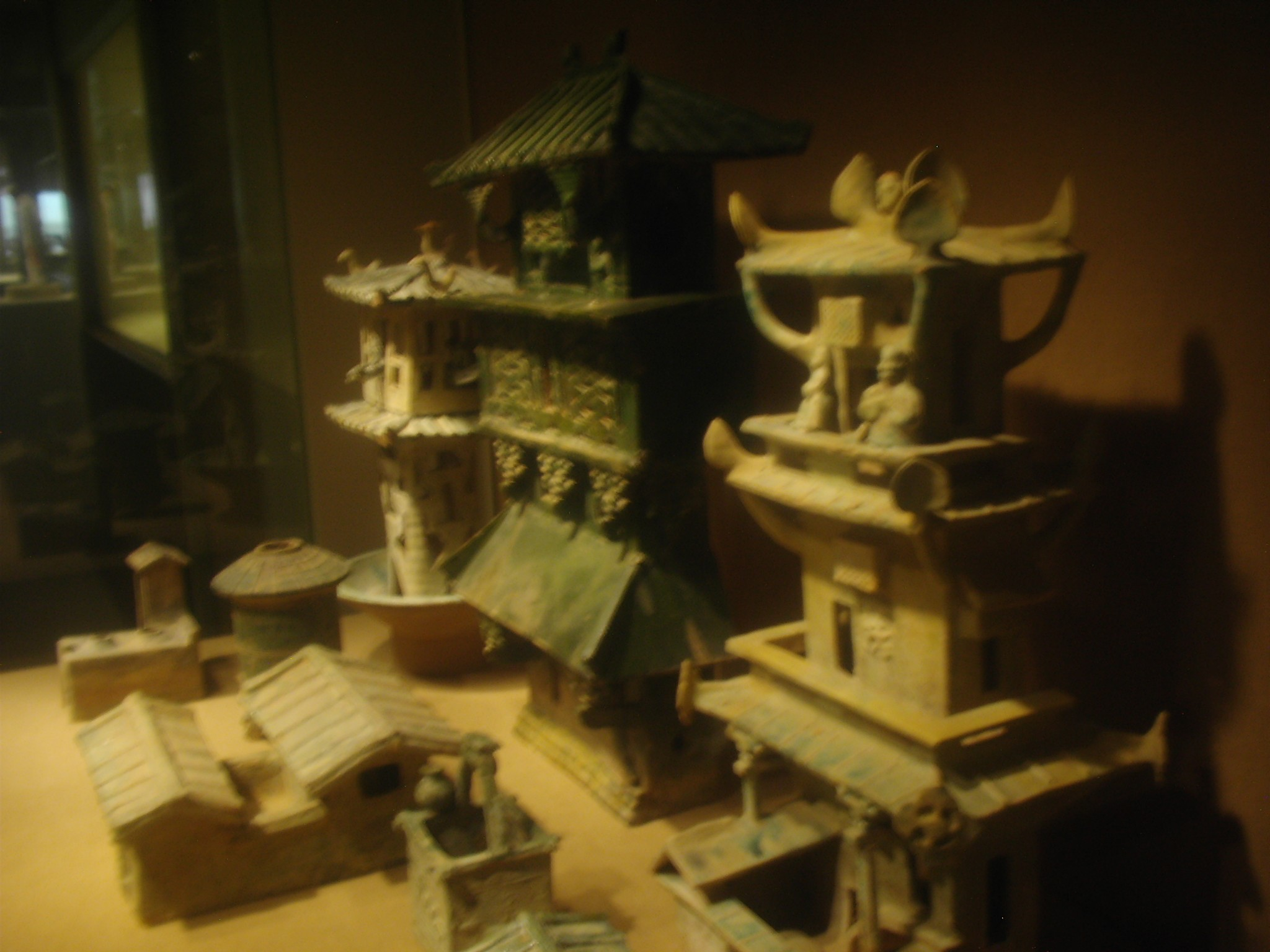
Models of watchtowers and other buildings made during the Eastern Han dynasty (AD 25–220); while these models were made of ceramics, the real versions were made of easily perishable wood and have not survived.

Wood was typically utilised as a primary building material. Also, Chinese culture holds that life connects with nature and that humans should interact with animated things. By contrast stone was associated with the homes of the dead. However, unlike other building materials, wooden structures are less durable. The Songyue Pagoda (built in 523) is China's oldest extant pagoda; its use of brick instead of wood allowed it to endure across the centuries. From the Tang dynasty (618–907) onwards, brick and stone architecture gradually became more common. The earliest examples of this transition can be seen in building projects such as the Zhaozhou Bridge completed in 605 or the Xumi Pagoda built in 636. Some stone and brick architecture was used in subterranean tomb architecture of earlier dynasties.

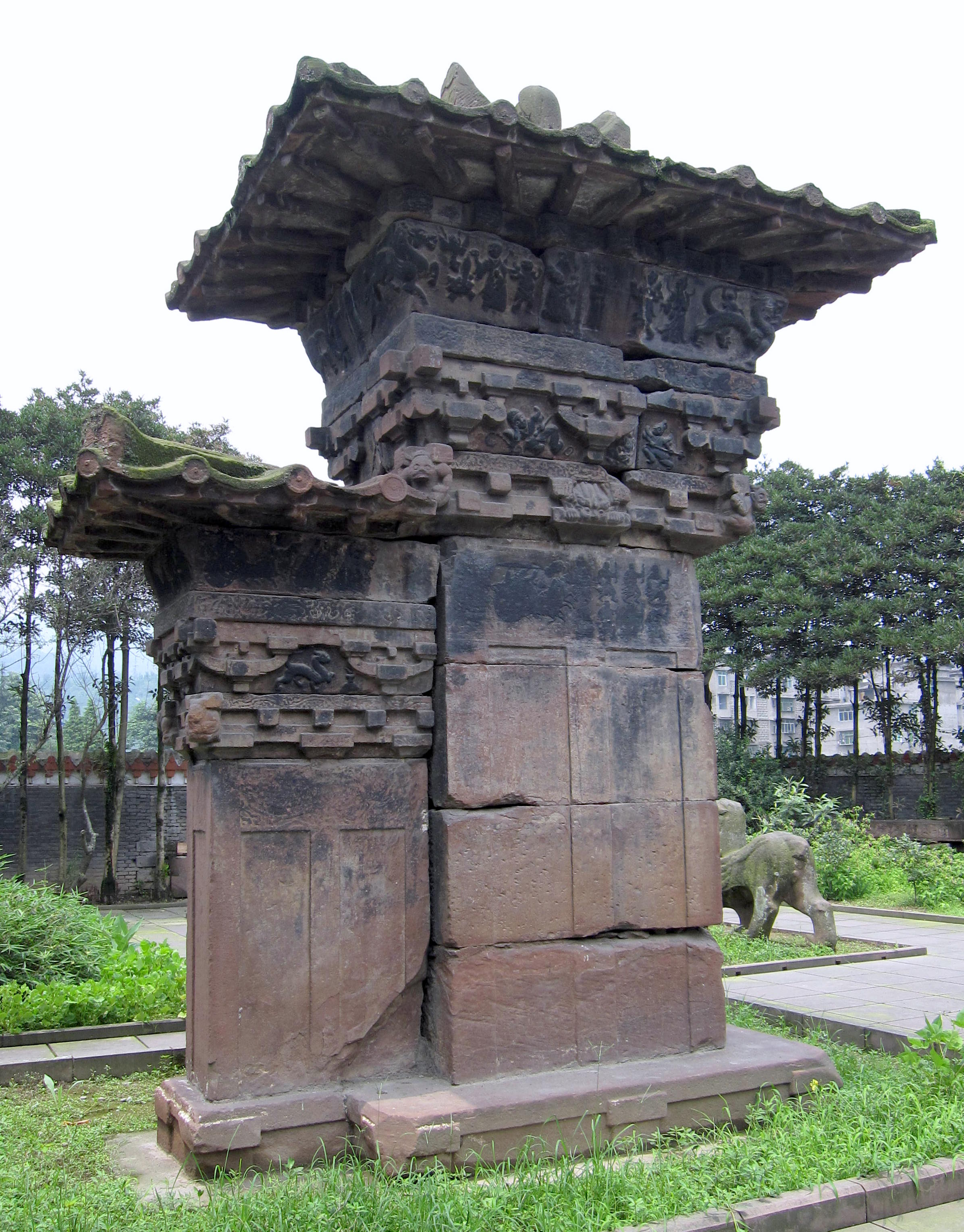
A stone-carved pillar-gate, or que (闕), 6 m (20 ft) in total height, located at the tomb of Gao Yi in Ya'an, Sichuan province, Eastern Han dynasty (25–220 AD); notice the stone-carved decorations of roof tile eaves, despite the fact that Han dynasty stone que (part of the walled structures around tomb entrances) lacked wooden or ceramic components (but often imitated wooden buildings with ceramic roof tiles).

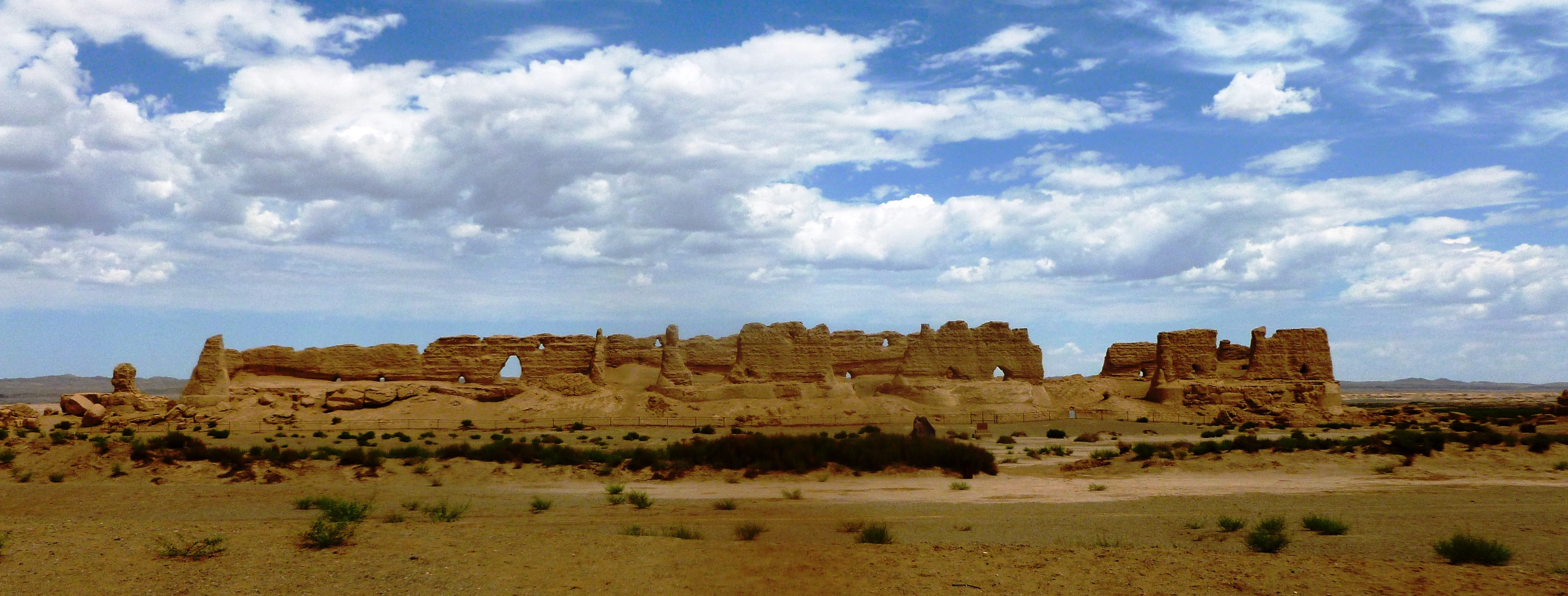
These rammed earth ruins of a granary in Hecang Fortress (Chinese: 河仓城; Pinyin: Hécāngchéng), located ~11 km (7 miles) northeast of the Yumen Pass, were built during the Western Han (202 BC – 9 AD) and significantly rebuilt during the Western Jin (280–316 AD).

In the early 20th century no known fully wood-constructed Tang dynasty buildings still existed; the oldest so far discovered was the 1931 find of Guanyin Pavilion at Dule Monastery, dated 984 during the Song dynasty. Later architectural historians Liang Sicheng, Lin Huiyin, Mo Zongjiang, discovered that the Great East Hall of Foguang Temple on Mount Wutai in Shanxi dated to 857. The ground floor of this monastic hall measures 34 by 17.66 m (111.5 by 57.9 ft). The main hall of nearby Nanchan Temple on Mount Wutai was later dated to 782. Six Tang era wooden buildings had been found by the 21st century. The oldest intact fully wooden pagoda is the Pagoda of Fogong Temple of the Liao dynasty, located in Ying County of Shanxi. While the East Hall of Foguang Temple features seven types of bracket arms in its construction, the 11th-century Pagoda of Fogong Temple features fifty-four.

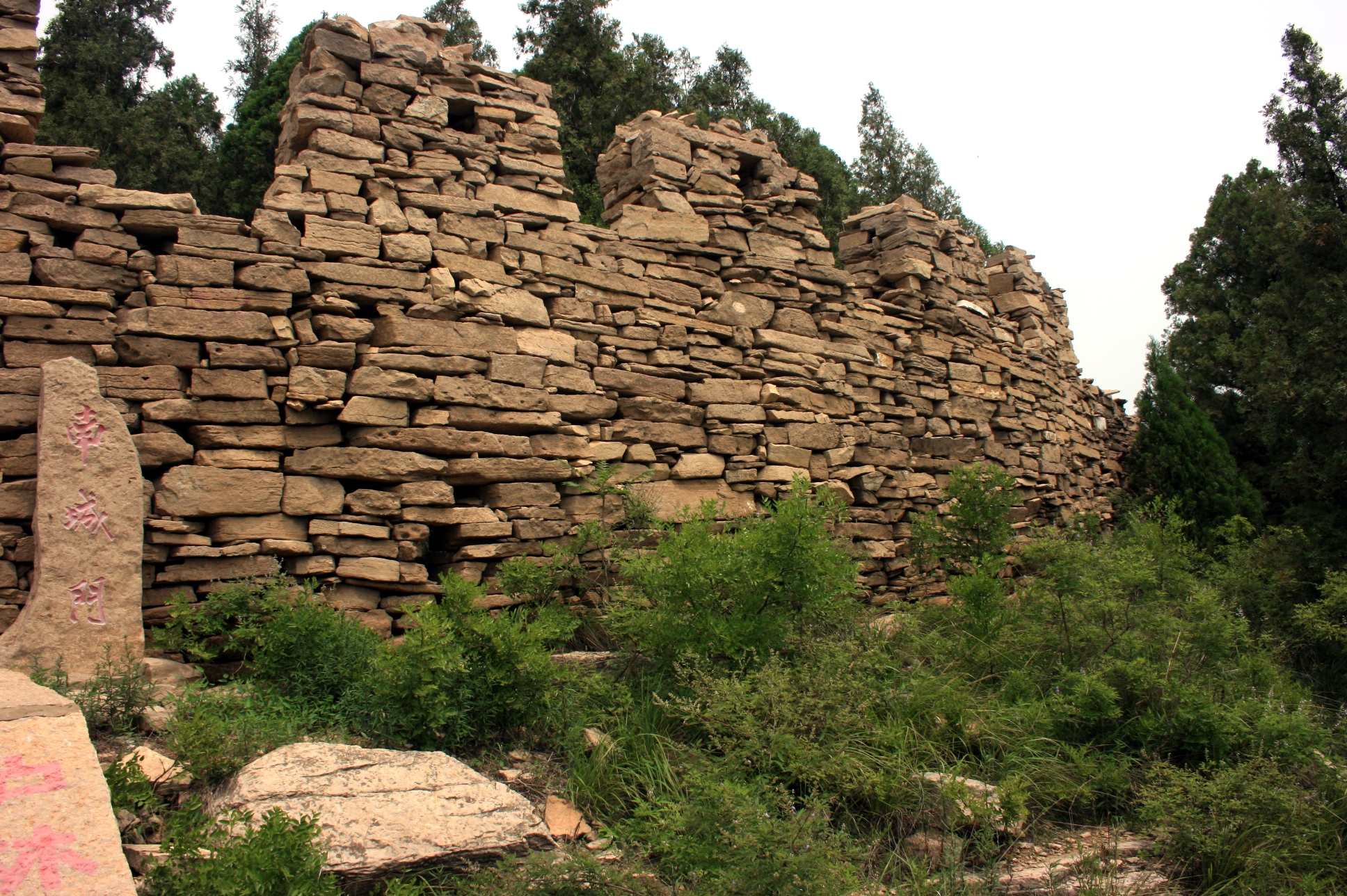
Remnants of the Great Wall of Qi on Dafeng Mountain, Changqing District, Jinan, which was once part of the ancient State of Qi during the Warring States period (475–221 BC).

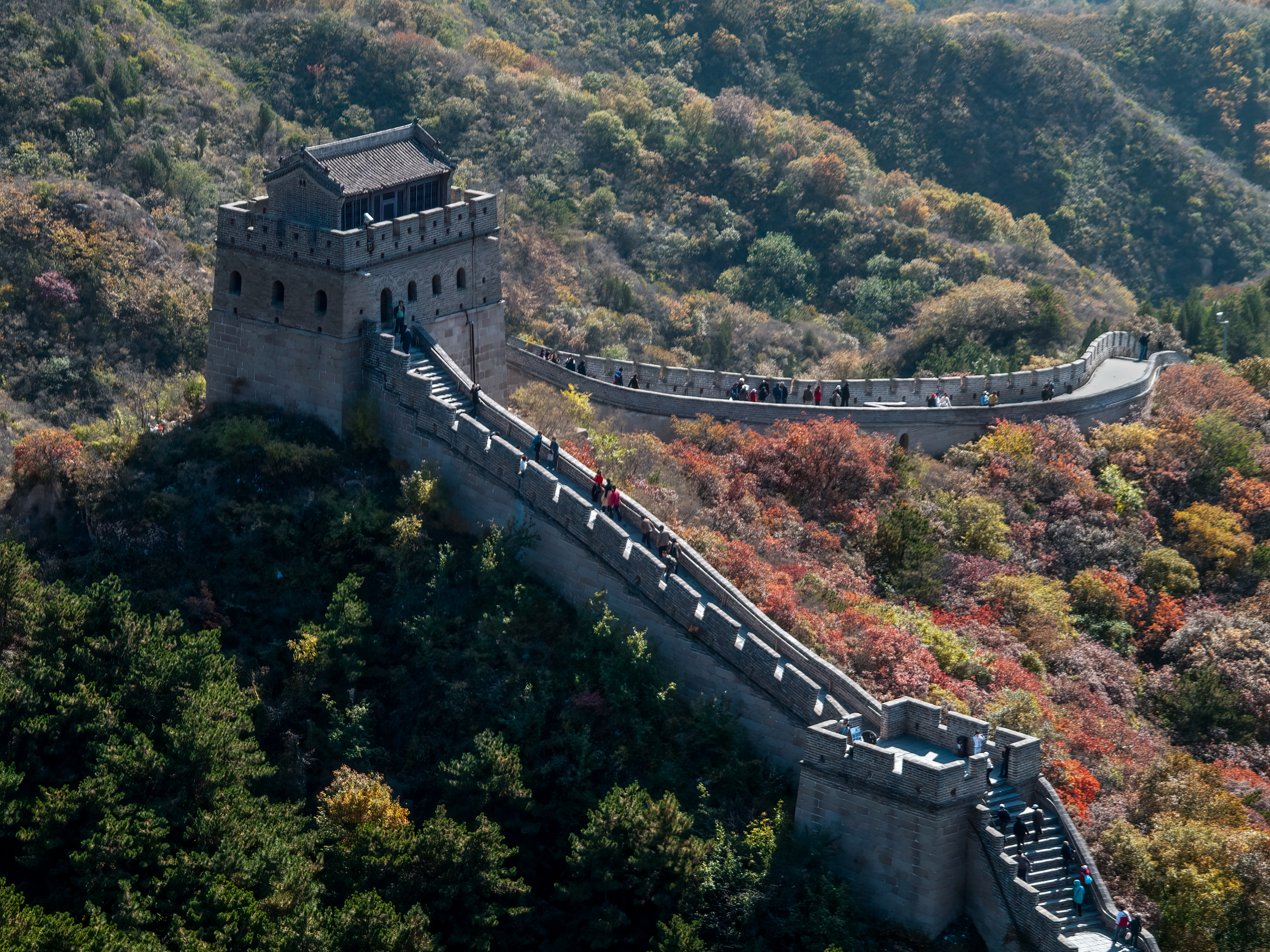
The Great Wall of China at Mutianyu, near Beijing, built during the Ming dynasty (1368–1644)

The earliest walls and platforms used rammed earth construction. Ancient sections of the Great Wall of China used brick and stone, although the brick and stone Great Wall seen today is a Ming dynasty renovation.

Buildings for public use and for elites usually consisted of earth mixed with bricks or stones on raised platforms which allowed them to survive. The earliest of this sort of construction was during the Shang dynasty (c. 1600 – 1046 BCE)

=== Structure ===
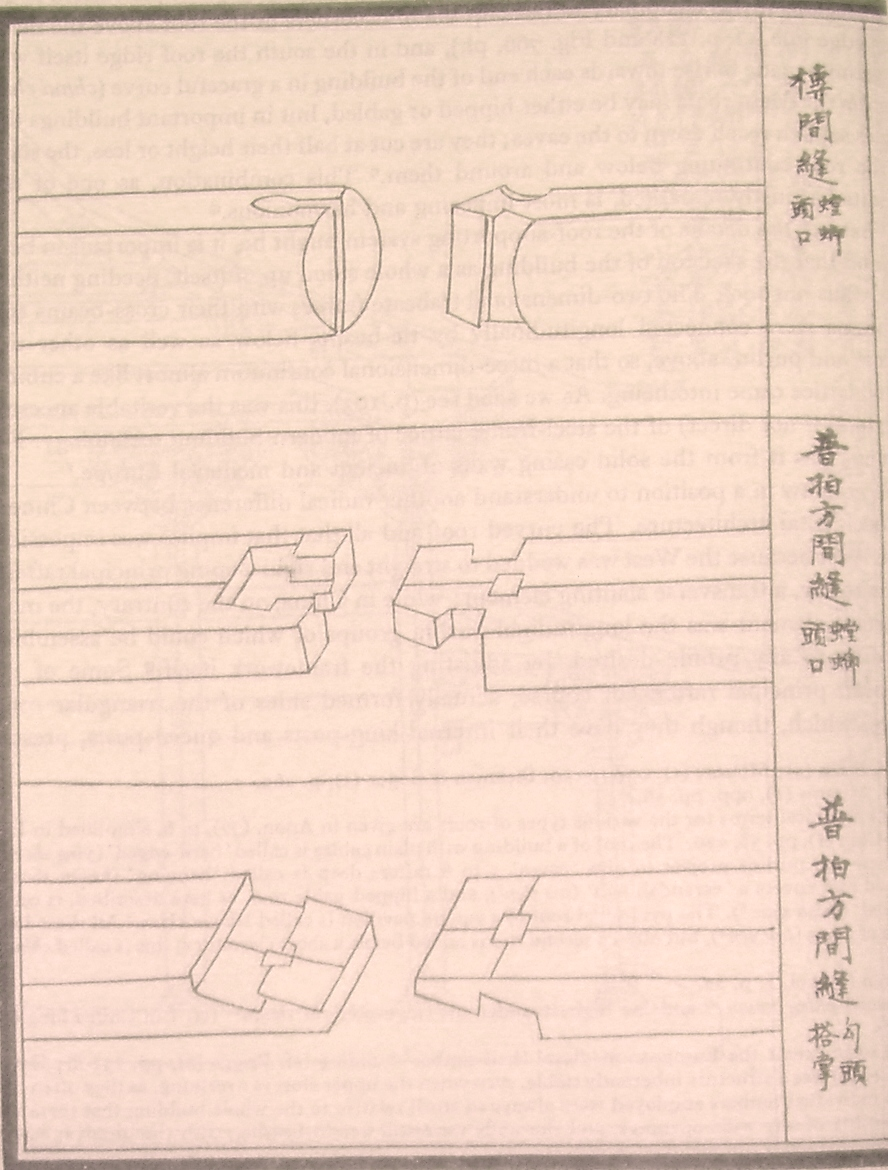
Mortise and tenon work of tie beams and cross beams, from Li Jie's building manual Yingzao Fashi, printed in 1103.

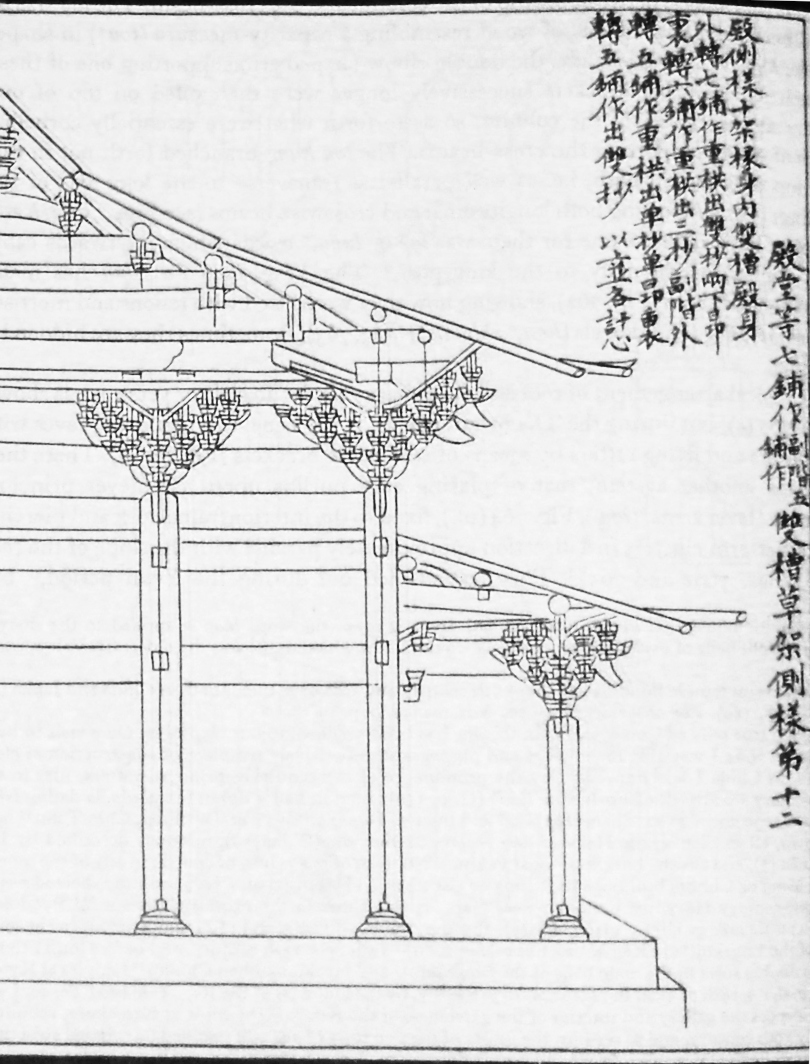
Diagram of corbel wood bracket supports ("dougong") holding up a multi-inclined roof, from the architectural treatise Yingzao Fashi (1103 AD)

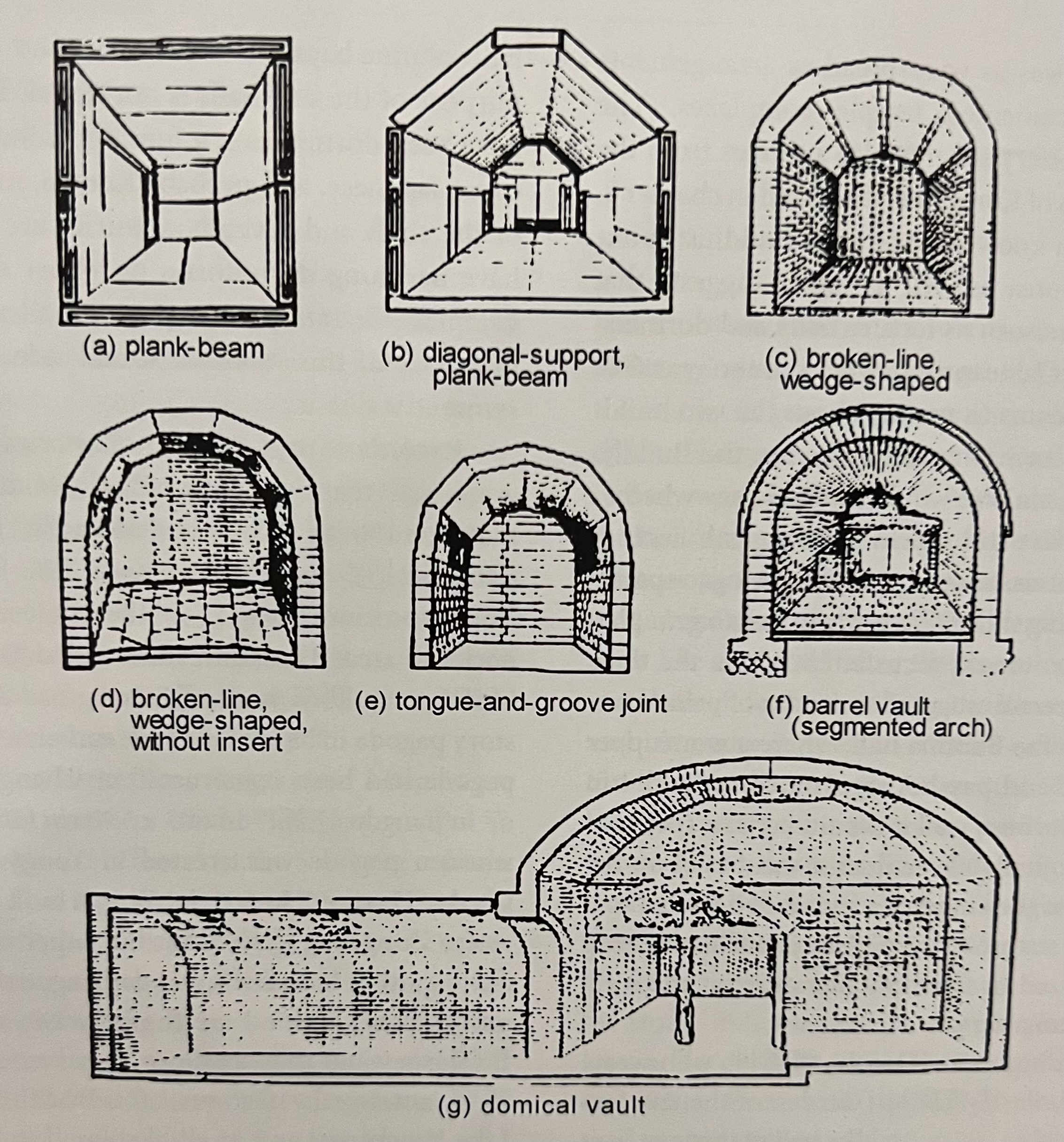
- Seven forms of Han vaulting Redrawn by Sijie Ren after Liu Dunzhen
  Ceilings: The form that served greatest interest was the English vault or dome. The ceiling had the appearance of posed of flat beams, diagonal-support planks (xiecheng banliang), broken-line wedge shaped with a plank inserted, tongue-and-groove joints, barrel vault, or a domical vault. Most of this construction would be done with wood.
- Foundation: Most buildings typically use raised platforms (臺基) as their foundations. Vertical structural beams may rest on stone pedestals (柱础) that occasionally rest on piles. In lower class construction, the platforms are constructed of rammed earth, either unpaved or paved with brick or ceramics. In the simplest cases vertical structural beams are driven into the ground. Upper class constructions typically sit on raised stone-paved rammed earth or stone foundations with ornately carved heavy stone pedestals for supporting large vertical structural beams. The beams remain on their pedestals solely by friction and the weight of the building structure.
  - Framing: Dating back to the 5th and 6th centuries, timber framing is evident in cave-temples like Mogao, Yungang, Maijishan and Tianlongshan. Most of these caves use the same method: eight sided columns, two-plate capitals, and alternating bracket arms and V-shaped braces. Whether or not certain structural supports were included was entirely up to what the artisans chose. There were no symbolic meanings behind these designs.
- Structural beams: Large structural timbers support the roof. Timber, usually large trimmed logs, are used as load-bearing columns and lateral beams. These beams are connected to each other directly or, in larger and higher class structures, tied through the use of brackets. These structural timbers are prominently displayed in finished structures. It is not definitively known how ancient builders raised the columns into position.
- Structural connections: Timber frames are typically constructed with joinery and dowelling, seldom with glue or nails. These types of semi-rigid structural joints allow the timber structure to resist bending and torsion under high compression. Structural stability is enhanced through the use of heavy beams and roofs. The lack of glue or nails in joinery, the use of non-rigid support such as dougong, and the use of wood as structural members allow the buildings to slide, flex, and hinge while absorbing shock, vibration, and ground shifts from earthquakes without significant damage. The rich decorated the Dougong with valuable materials to display their wealth. Common people used artwork to express their appreciation to the house.
- Walls: Curtain walls or door panels delineated rooms or enclosed a building, with the general de-emphasis of load-bearing walls in most higher class construction. However, later dynasties faced a shortage of trees, leading to the use of load-bearing walls in non-governmental or religious construction, made of brick and stone.
- Roofs: Flat roofs are uncommon while gabled roofs are omnipresent. Roofs are either built on roof cross-beams or rest directly on vertical structural beams. In higher class construction, roof beams are supported through complex dougong bracketing systems that indirectly connect them to the primary structural beams. The three main types of roofs are:
  - Straight inclined: Roofs with a single incline. These are the most economical and are most prevalent in commoner structures.
  - Multi-inclined: Roofs with 2 or more sections of incline. These roofs are used in higher class constructions.
  - Sweeping: Roofs with a sweeping curvature that rises at the corners. This type is usually reserved for temples and palaces although it may also be found in the homes of the wealthy. In the former cases, the roof ridges are usually highly decorated with ceramic figurines.
- Roof apex: The roof apex of a large hall is usually topped with a ridge of tiles and statues for decorative purposes as well as to weigh down the tiles for stability. These ridges are often well decorated, especially for religious or palatial structures. In some regions, the ridges are sometimes extended or incorporated into the walls of the building to form matouqiang (horse-head walls), which served as a fire deterrent from drifting embers.
- Roof top decorations: Symbolism can be found in the colors of the eaves, roofing materials and roof top decorations. Gold/yellow is an auspicious (good) color, imperial roofs are gold or yellow. Green roofs symbolize bamboo shafts, which in turn represent youth and longevity.
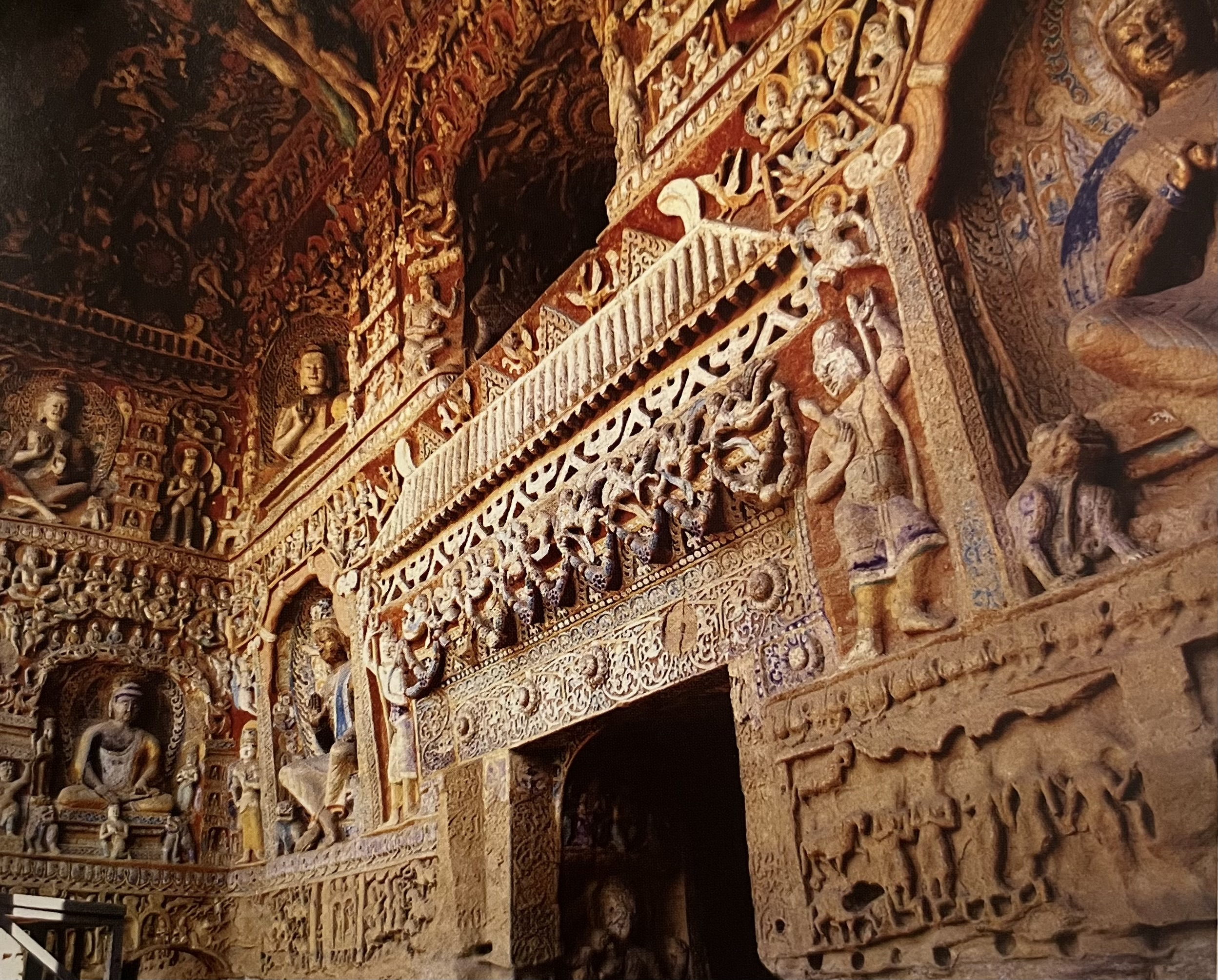
  - North and west walls, front chamber of cave 9, showing "Ionic" capitals on north wall, late 5th century
    Patterns, decoration, elaboration, and ornament: all signatures dating back to Chinese architecture from the 5th and 6th century. Many cave temples demonstrate such practice. Studies find that certain patterns were repeated often in different locations across different dynasties. It was also found that designs found in western Asian art travelled to patterns found in Chinese timber.

== Classification by structure ==
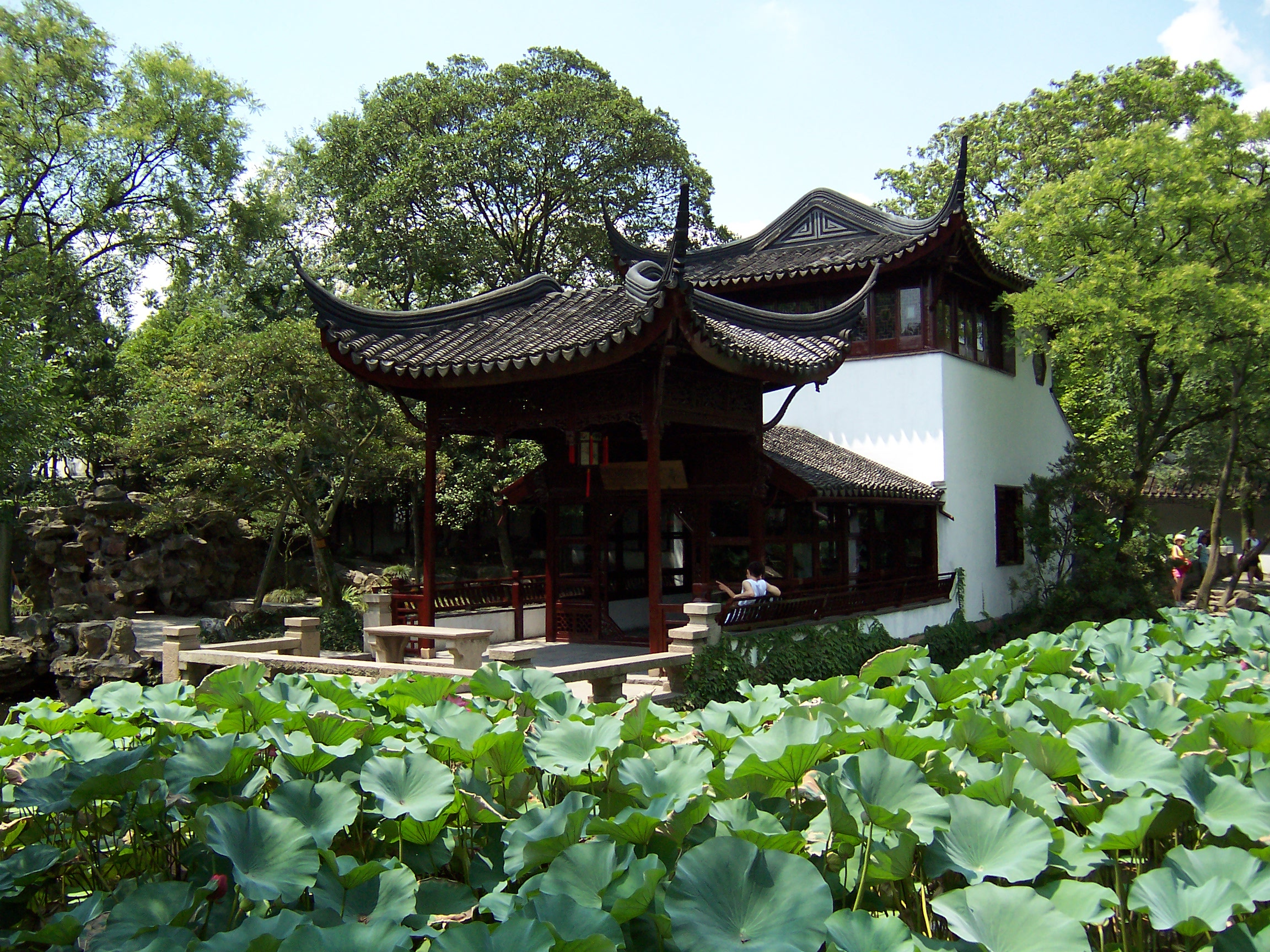
A pavilion inside the Zhuozheng Garden in Suzhou, Jiangsu province, one of the finest gardens in China

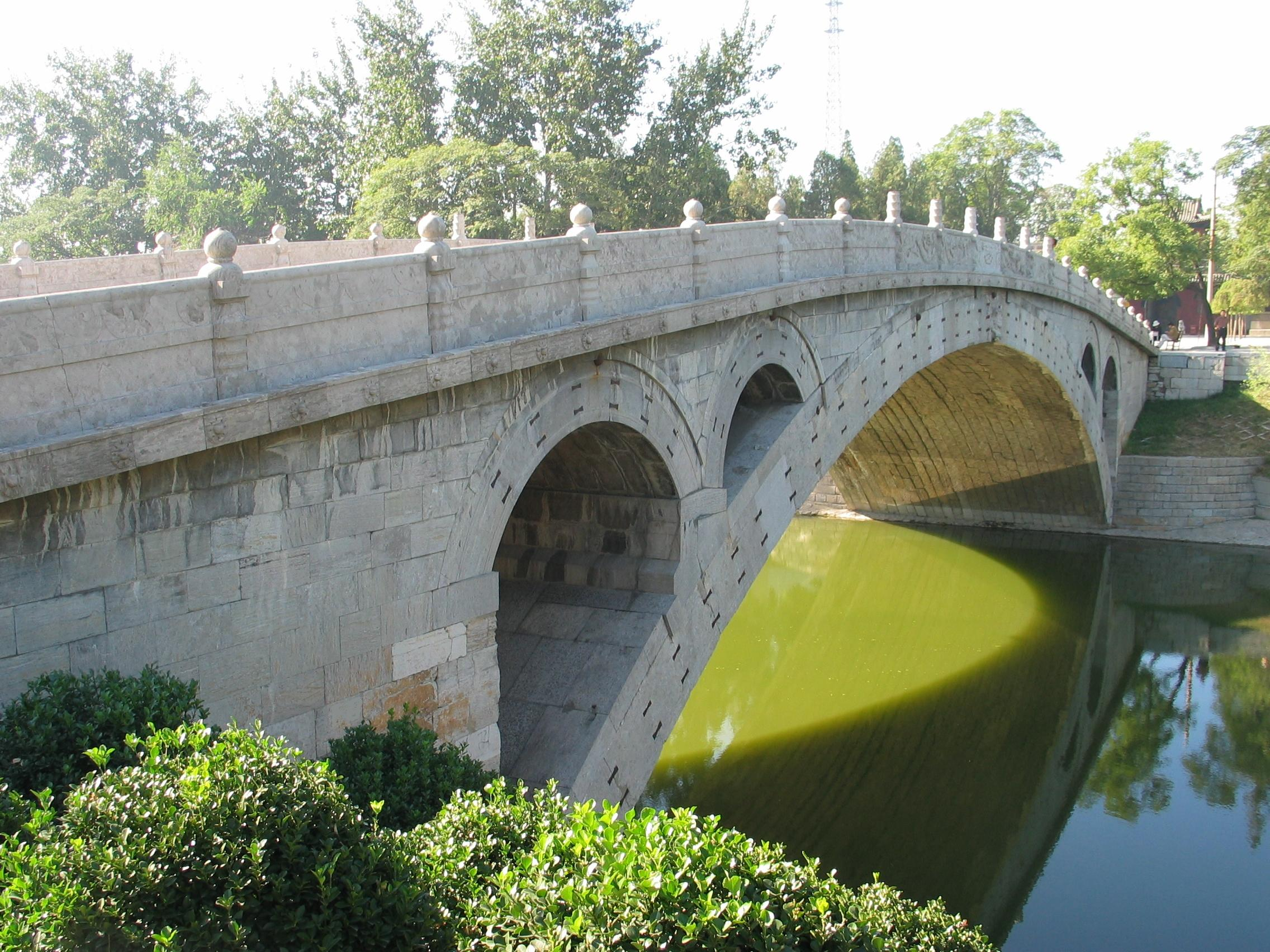
The Zhaozhou Bridge, built from 595 to 605 during the Sui dynasty. It is the oldest fully stone open-spandrel segmental arch bridge in the world.

Chinese classifications for architecture include:

- 亭 (Chinese: 亭; pinyin: Tíng) ting (Chinese pavilions)
- 臺 (simplified Chinese: 台; traditional Chinese: 臺; pinyin: Taí) tai (terraces)
- 樓 (simplified Chinese: 楼; traditional Chinese: 樓; pinyin: Lóu) lou (multistory buildings)
- 閣 (simplified Chinese: 阁; traditional Chinese: 閣; pinyin: Gé) ge (two-story pavilions)
- 軒 (轩) xuan (verandas with windows)
- 塔 ta (Chinese pagodas)
- 榭 xie (pavilions or houses on terraces)
- 屋 wu (Rooms along roofed corridors)
- 斗拱 (Chinese: 斗拱; pinyin: Dǒugǒng) dougong interlocking wooden brackets, often used in clusters to support roofs and add ornamentation.
- 藻井 Caisson domed or coffered ceiling
- 宮 (simplified Chinese: 宫; traditional Chinese: 宮; pinyin: Gōng) palaces, larger buildings used as imperial residences, temples, or centers for cultural activities.

== Miniature models ==
Although mostly only ruins of brick and rammed earth walls and towers from ancient China (i.e. before the 6th century AD) survive, information on ancient Chinese architecture (especially wooden architecture) can be discerned from clay models of buildings created as funerary items. This is similar to the paper joss houses burned in some modern Chinese funerals. The following models were made during the Han dynasty (202 BC – AD 220):

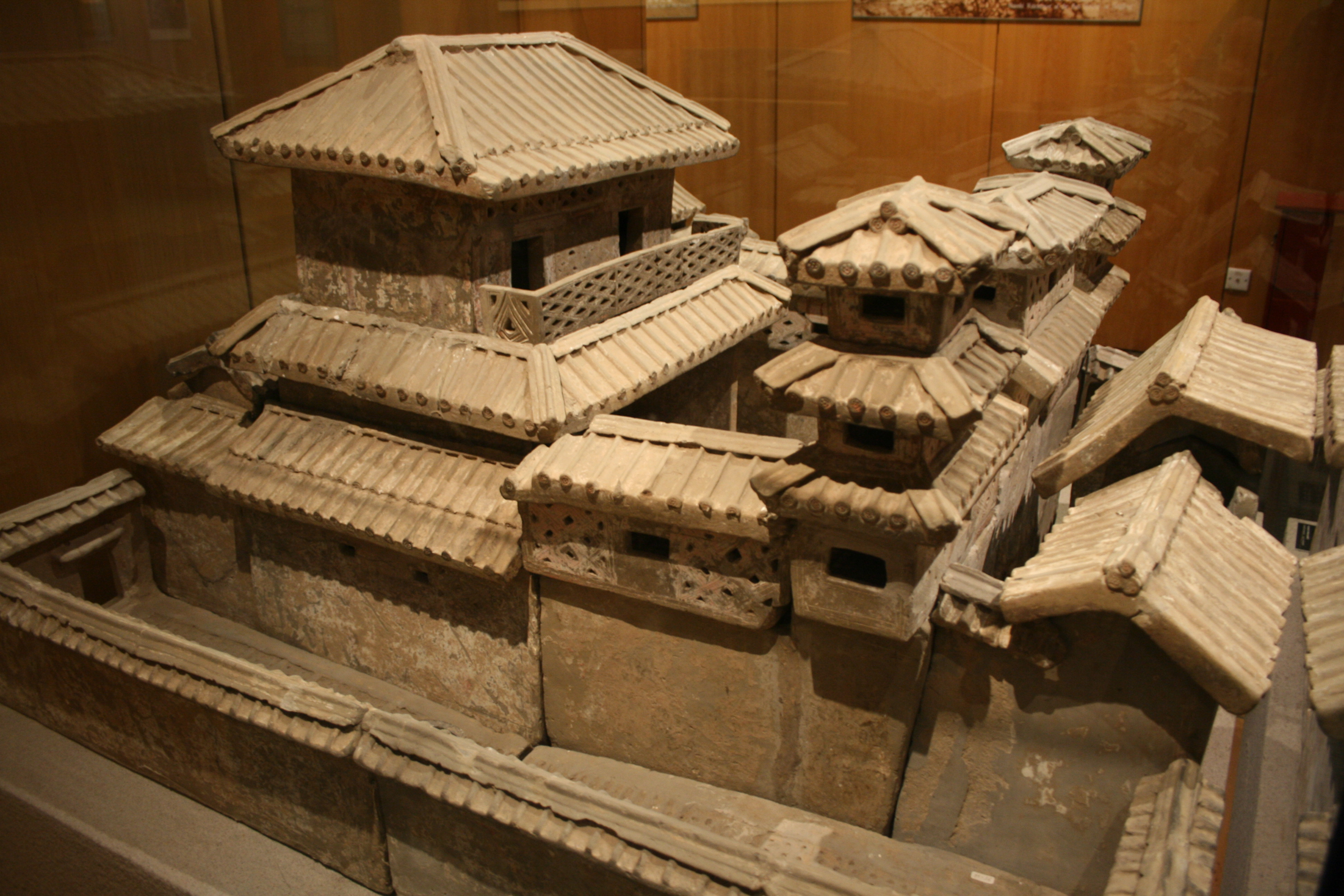
A pottery palace from the Han dynasty (202 BC – AD 220)

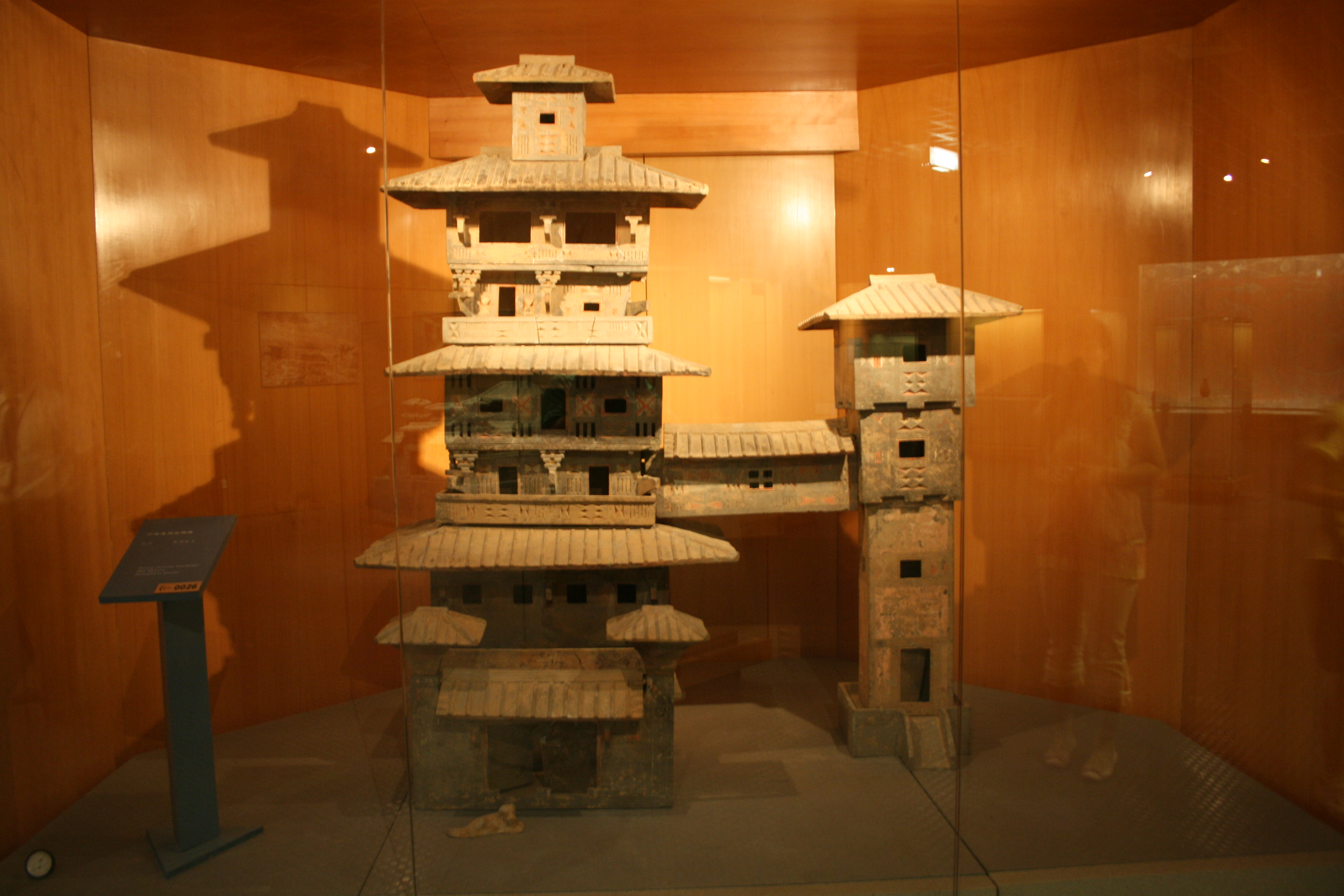
Two residential towers joined by a bridge, pottery miniature, Han dynasty (202 BC – AD 220)

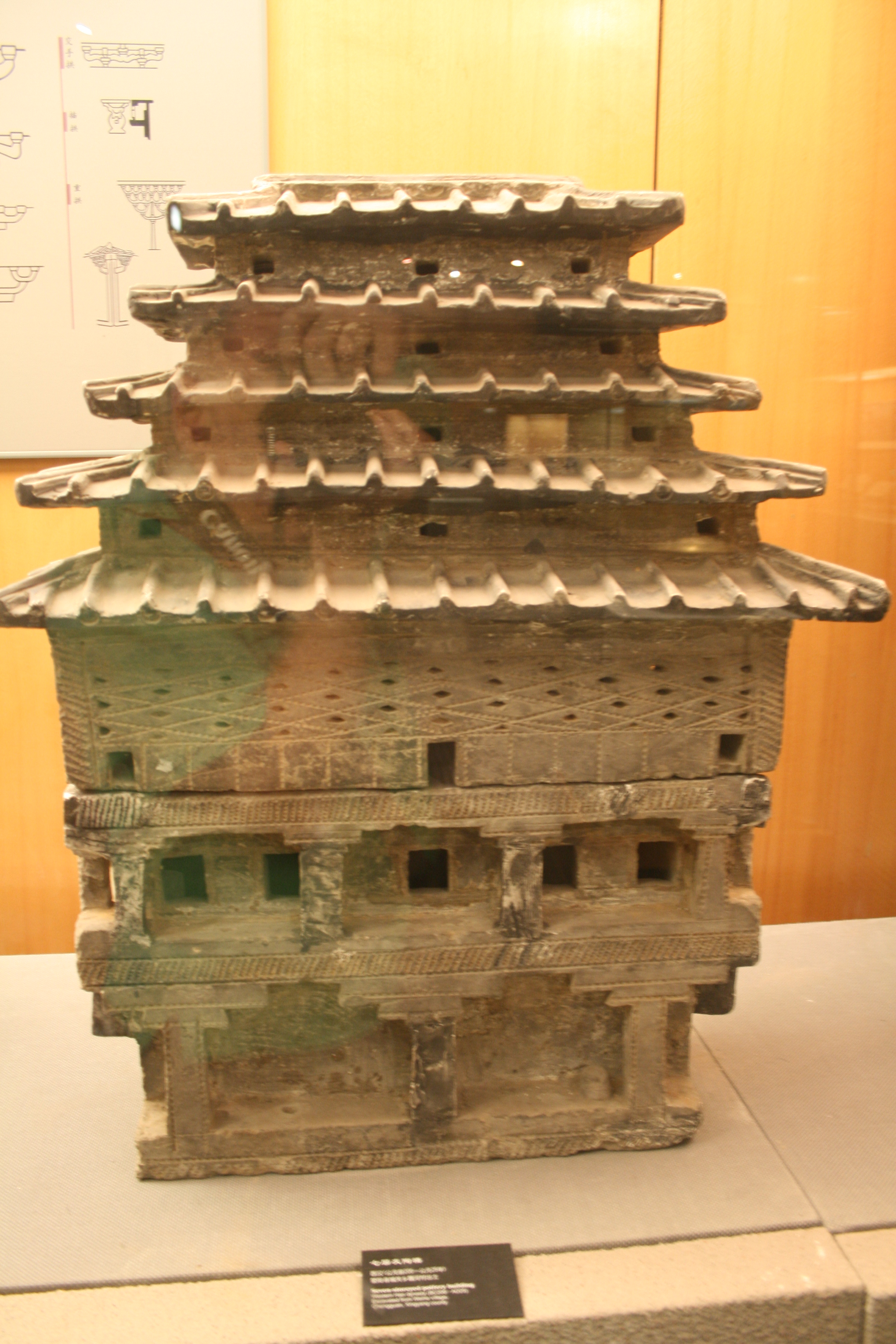
A pottery tower from the Han dynasty (202 BC – AD 220)

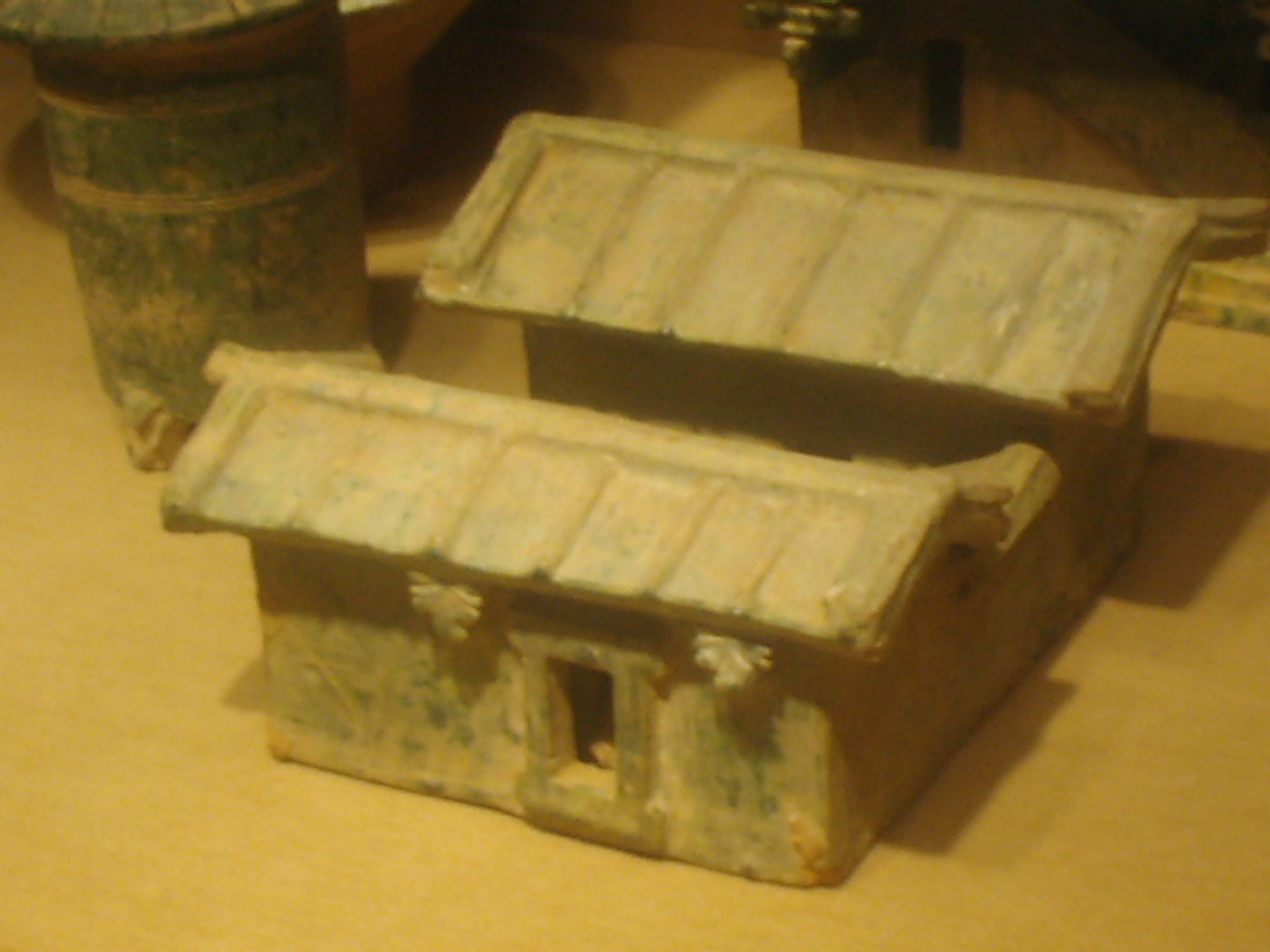
A ceramic model of a house with a courtyard, from the Han dynasty (202 BC – AD 220)

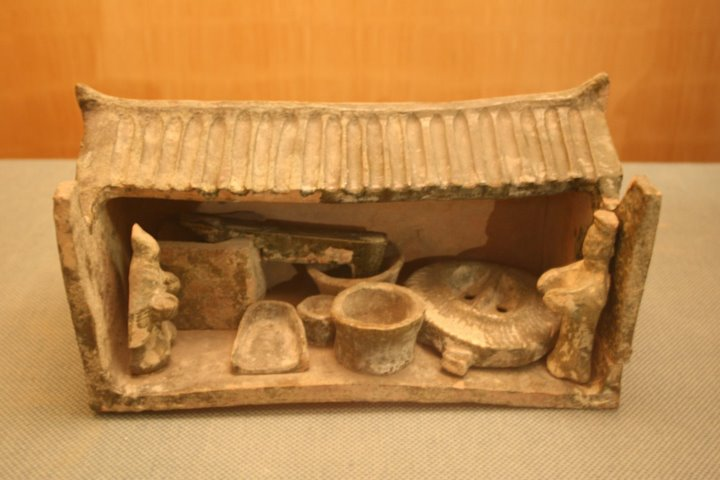
A pottery gristmill from the Han dynasty (202 BC – AD 220)

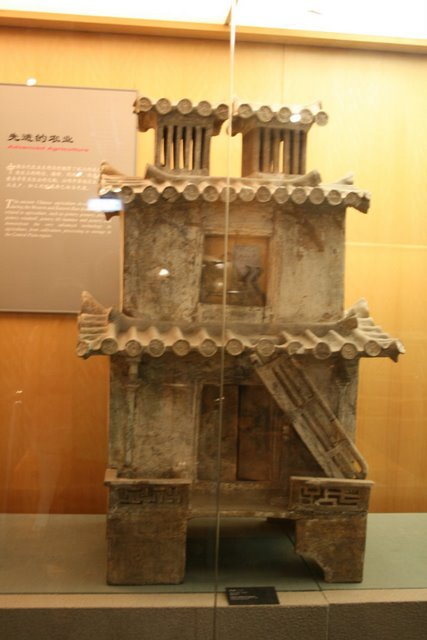
A pottery tower from the Han dynasty (202 BC – AD 220)

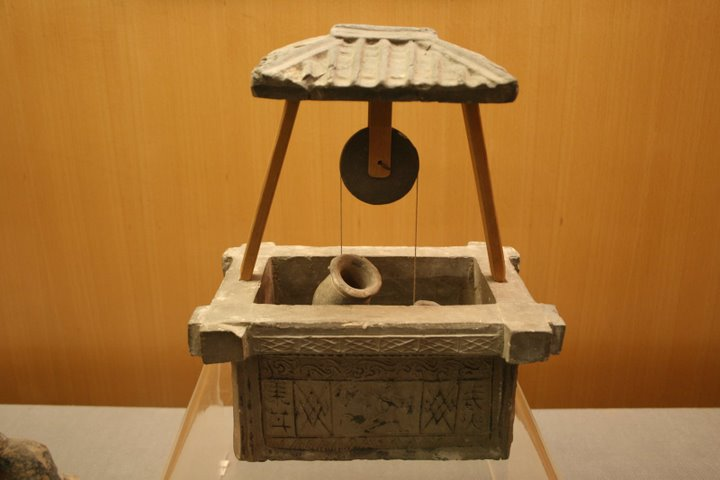
A pottery model of a well from the Han dynasty (202 BC – AD 220)

During the Jin dynasty (266–420) and the Six Dynasties, miniature models of buildings or entire architectural ensembles were often made to decorate the tops of the so-called "soul vases" (hunping), found in many tombs of that period.

== Culture ==
Beyond China's physically creative architecture techniques lies an "imaginary architecture". This imaginary architecture reflected three major principles that carry messages about the relations between inhabitants, society, and the cosmos, and that depict gender power imbalances.

=== Confucius ===
The first design principle was that the Chinese house was the embodiment of Neo-Confucian values. These collaborative values were loyalty, respect, and service. They were depicted through representations of generations, gender, and age. The Chinese home was a community in itself that sheltered a patrilineal kinship clan. It was quite common for houses to shelter "five generations under one roof". Social concepts reflected the Five Relationships between "ruler and subject, father and child, husband and wife, elder and younger brother and friends." The unequal relationship between the superior and subordinate in these relationships was emphasized. The relationship between husband and wife was patriarchal. The husband was required to treat the spouse with kindness, consideration, and understanding.

=== Cosmic space ===
The Chinese house was a cosmic space. The house was designed as a shelter to foil evil influences by channeling cosmic energies (qi) by respecting feng shui. Depending on the season, astral cycle, landscape, and the house's design, orientation, and architectural details, some amount of energy would be produced. However, cosmic energy could be used in both moral and immoral ways. The moral way is by adding feng shui to a local community temple. Feng shui could also be used competitively to raise the value of one's house at the expense of others. For example, if someone built part of their house against the norm, their house could be considered a threat, because it was recklessly throwing off cosmic energy. In one detailed account, a fight broke out over feng shui.

Feng shui was also incorporated inside the home. Symmetry, orientations, arrangements of objects, and cleanliness were important factors to direct cosmic energy. Even in poorer homes cleanliness and tidiness were highly desired to compensate for the lack of space. Sweeping was a daily task that was thought to be a purifying act. Chinese historian Sima Guang writes, "The servants of the inner and outer quarters and the concubines all rise at the first crow of the cock. After combing their hair, washing, and getting dressed, the male servants should sweep the halls and front courtyard; the doorman and older servants should sweep the middle courtyard, while the maids sweep the living quarters, arrange tables and chairs, and prepare for the toilet of the master and mistress." The task of cleaning further illustrates, the gender segregation of the Chinese household.

=== Culture ===
The house was a space of culture that depicted the Chinese view of humanity. The house was a domestic domain, separated from the undomesticated world. The separation was commonly realized through walls and gates. Gates were first a physical barrier and second a notice board.

The home was where family rules could be enforced, dividing the upbringing of the inhabitants.

Women were often hidden away within the inner walls to perform domestic duties, while men would freely interact with the outside.

While brides entered an unknown and potentially hostile environment, the husband "never had to leave his parents or his home, he knew which lineage and which landscape he belonged to from the time he began to understand the world." New brides were typically treated badly by senior household members. Junior brides might be treated like unpaid servants and forced to do unpleasant chores. Bray characterized marriage as the bride's descent into hell. "The analogy of the wedding process with death is made explicit: the bride describes herself as being prepared for death, and the wedding process as the crossing of the yellow river that is the boundary between this life and the next. She appeals for justice, citing the valuable and unrecognized contribution she has made to her family. Her language is bitter and unrestrained, and she even curses the matchmaker and her future husband's family. Such lamenting can take place only within her parents' household and must cease halfway on the road to her new home, when the invisible boundary has been crossed." Women were fully accepted into a new home only after bearing a child.

The confinement of women was also a method of controlling their sexual lives. Confinement was used to prevent impregnation by an outsider who might thereby claim a slice of the family's wealth. Bray claimed that wives were often represented as "gossiping troublemakers eager to stir up strife between otherwise devoted brothers, the root of family discord, requiring strict patriarchal control."

Husbands and wives did not stay in the same private room for long periods. During the day, men would go out or work in their studies, avoiding unnecessary contact with female relatives. Women were generally confined to the inner perimeter. When leaving the inner perimeter, they must cover their face with a veil or a sleeve. Conversely, men were not usually permitted to enter the inner perimeter, providing women some control over their daily experience.

== Influence from outside of China ==
Some Chinese mosques architecture received influence from abroad, particularly during dynasties such as the Yuan, which were more outward-facing. The arrival of many Muslim officials, architects and scholars from the Islamic world during the Yuan dynasty led to an influx of Islamic elements, especially in Chinese mosques.

The Zhenghai Mosque in Ningbo is an example of Islamic architecture that appeared in China during the Song dynasty. When Arabic traders settled in Ningbo, they spread Muslim culture and built a mosque. Later, mosques were built around Beijing. The mosques of Xi'an such as Xi'an Great Mosque and Daxuexi Alley Mosque reflected similar influences. Beijing's mosques follow essentially the norms of Chinese layout, design, and traditional wooden structure.

Many miniature pagodas exist in Northeast China. They were built by Buddhists during the Liao dynasty (907–1125), which supported Buddhism. They developed Buddhist architecture that used bricks. Many such pagodas spread from Hebei Province to Beijing and Inner Mongolia.

== Influence beyond China ==
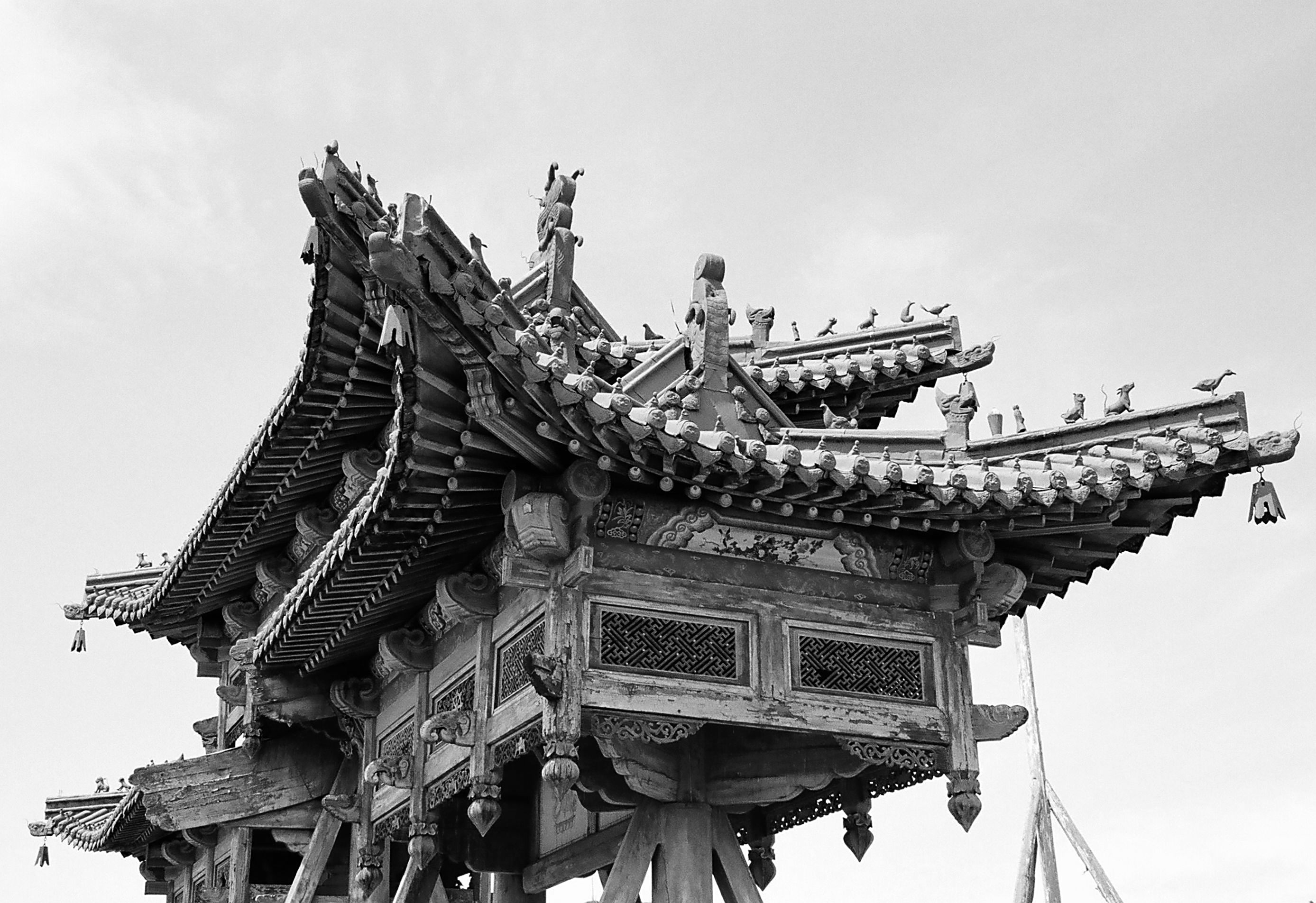
Gate detail at the Green Palace, in Ulaanbaatar, Mongolia contains Chinese architectural influences.

Chinese architecture has influenced the architecture of many other East Asian countries. During the Tang dynasty, much Chinese culture was imported by neighboring nations. Chinese architecture had a major influence on the architectural styles of Japan, Korea, Mongolia, and Vietnam where the East Asian hip-and-gable roof design is ubiquitous.

Chinese architecture influenced the architecture of various Southeast Asian countries. Chinese architectural elements were adopted by Thai artisans after trade commenced with the Yuan and Ming dynasties. Temple and palace roof tops adopted Chinese-style. Chinese-style buildings can be found in Ayutthaya, a nod towards the many Chinese shipbuilders, sailors and traders who came to the country. In Indonesia, mosques bearing Chinese influence can be found. This influence is recent in comparison to other parts of Asia and is largely due to the Chinese Indonesian community.

In South Asia, Chinese architecture played a significant role in shaping Sri Lankan architecture, alongside influences from other parts of Southeast Asia. The Kandyan roof style, for example bears many similarities to the East Asian hip-and-gable roof technique.

The Chinese-origin guardian lion is also found in front of Buddhist temples, buildings and some Hindu temples (in Nepal) across Asia including Japan, Korea, Thailand, Myanmar, Vietnam, Sri Lanka, Nepal, Cambodia and Laos.

== Regional variation ==
Chinese architecture varied across regions. Several of the more notable regional styles include:

=== Shanxi architecture ===
Shanxi preserves the oldest wooden structures in China from Tang dynasty, including the Foguang Temple and Nanchan Temple. Yungang Grottoes in Datong and numerous Buddhist temples in the sacred Mount Wutai exemplify Chinese religious architecture. Shanxi family compounds are representative of vernacular architecture in North China. In the mountainous areas of Shanxi, yaodong is a type of earth shelter that is commonly found.

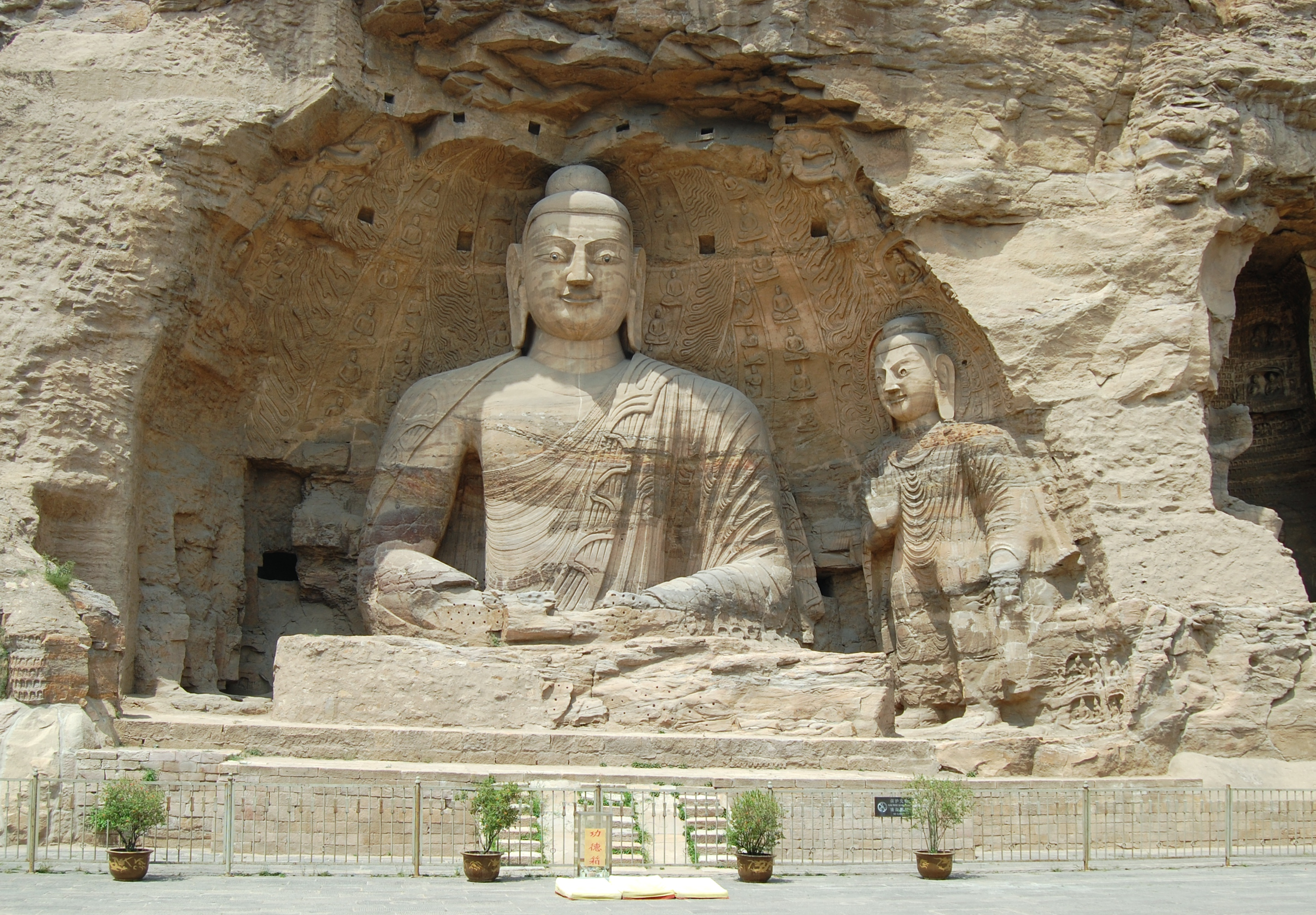
Yungang Grottoes (云冈石窟), Datong (大同), China.

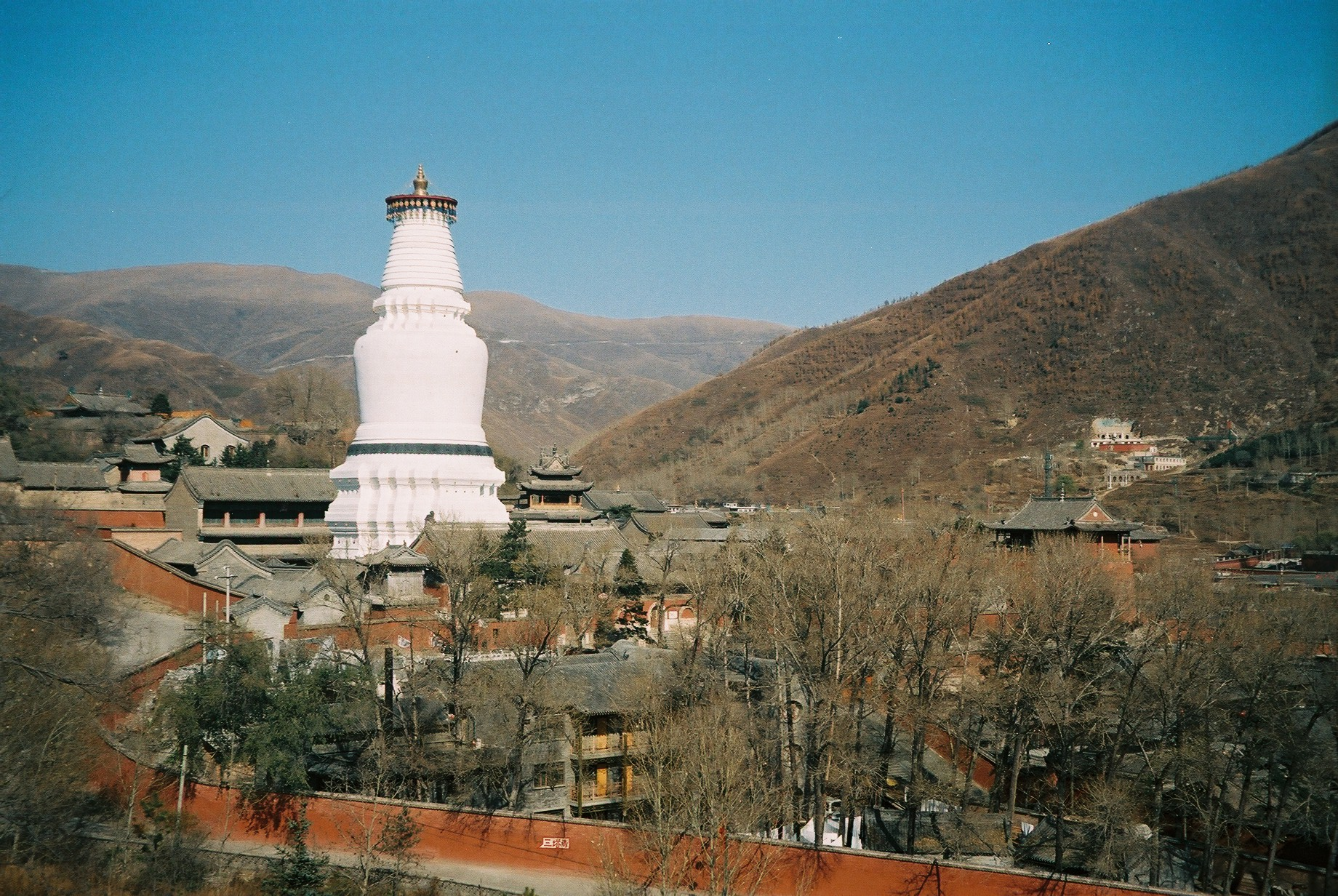
Temples in Mount Wutai (五台山)

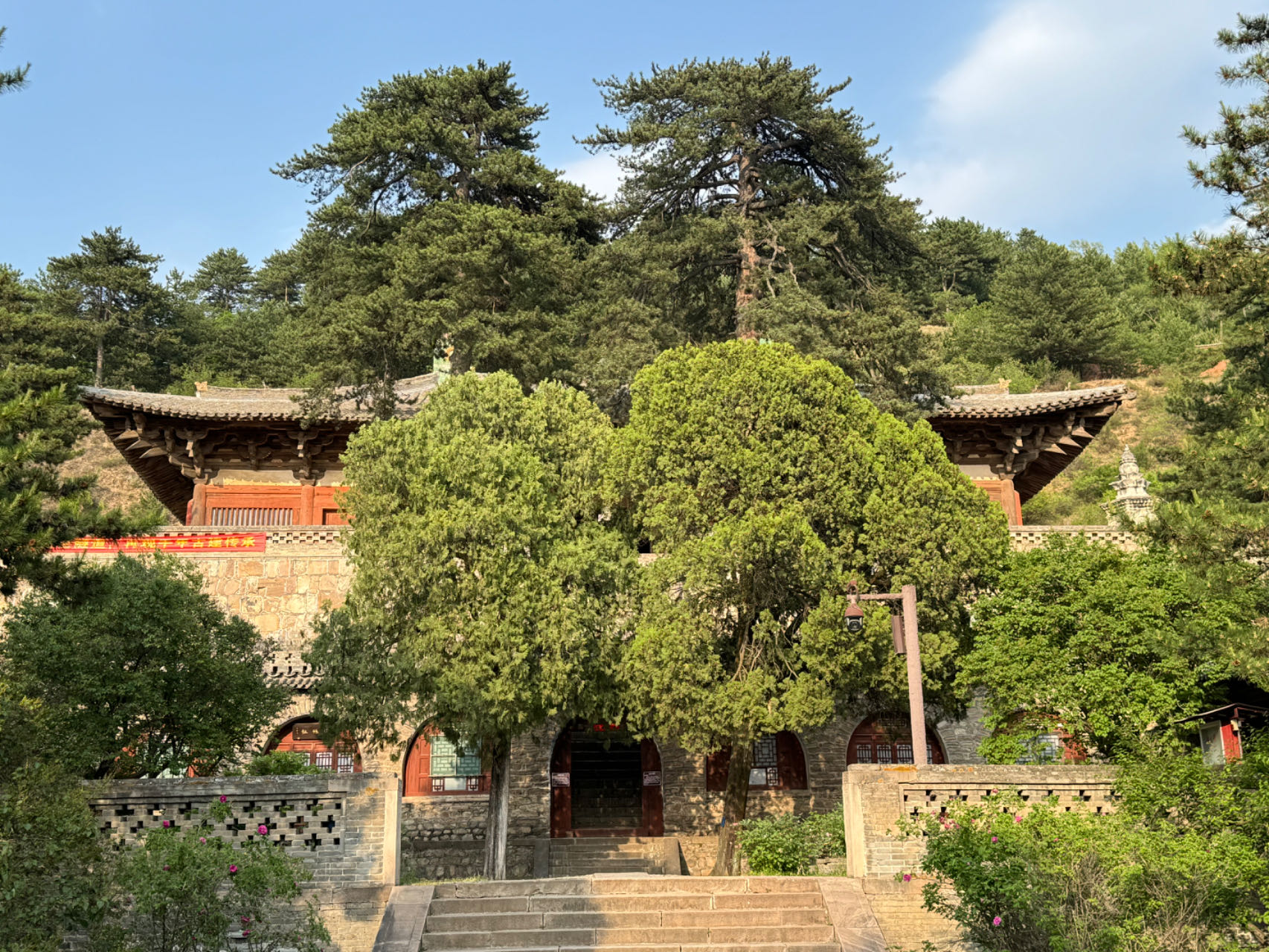
The Grand East Hall of the Foguang Temple (佛光寺东大殿), in Mount Wutai

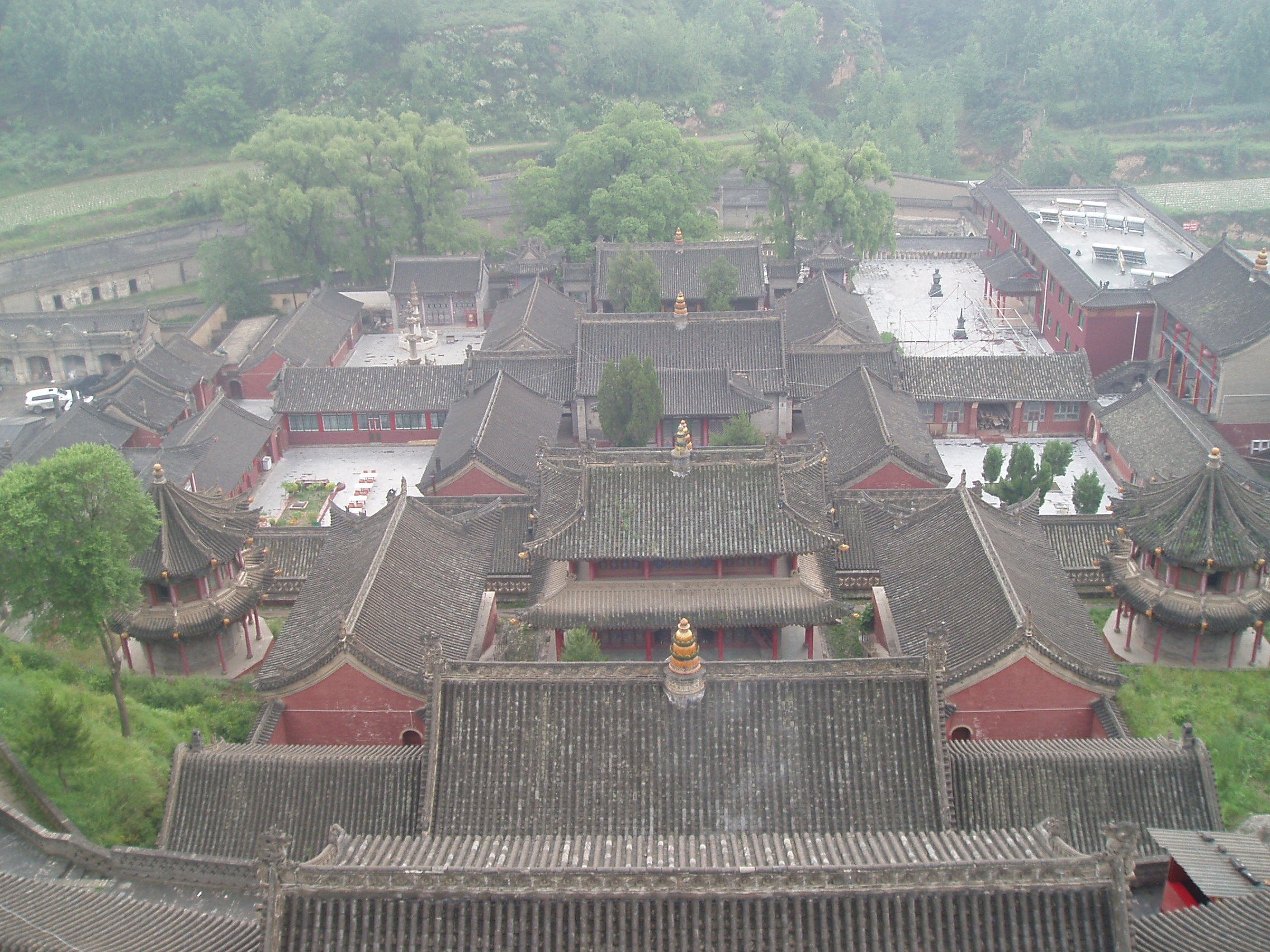
Birdview of the Zunsheng Temple (尊胜寺) in Mount Wutai

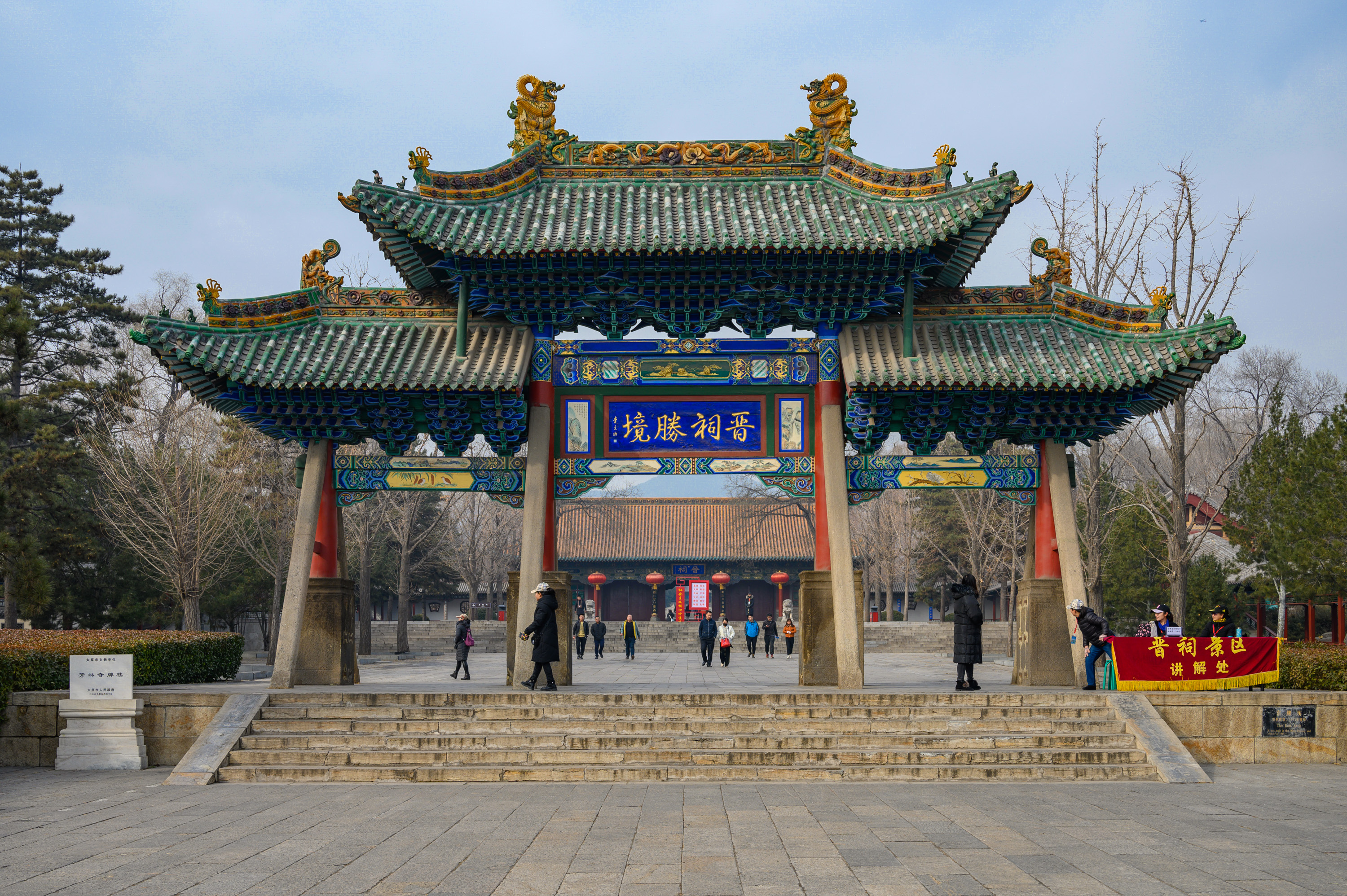
Jinci (晋祠), Taiyuan

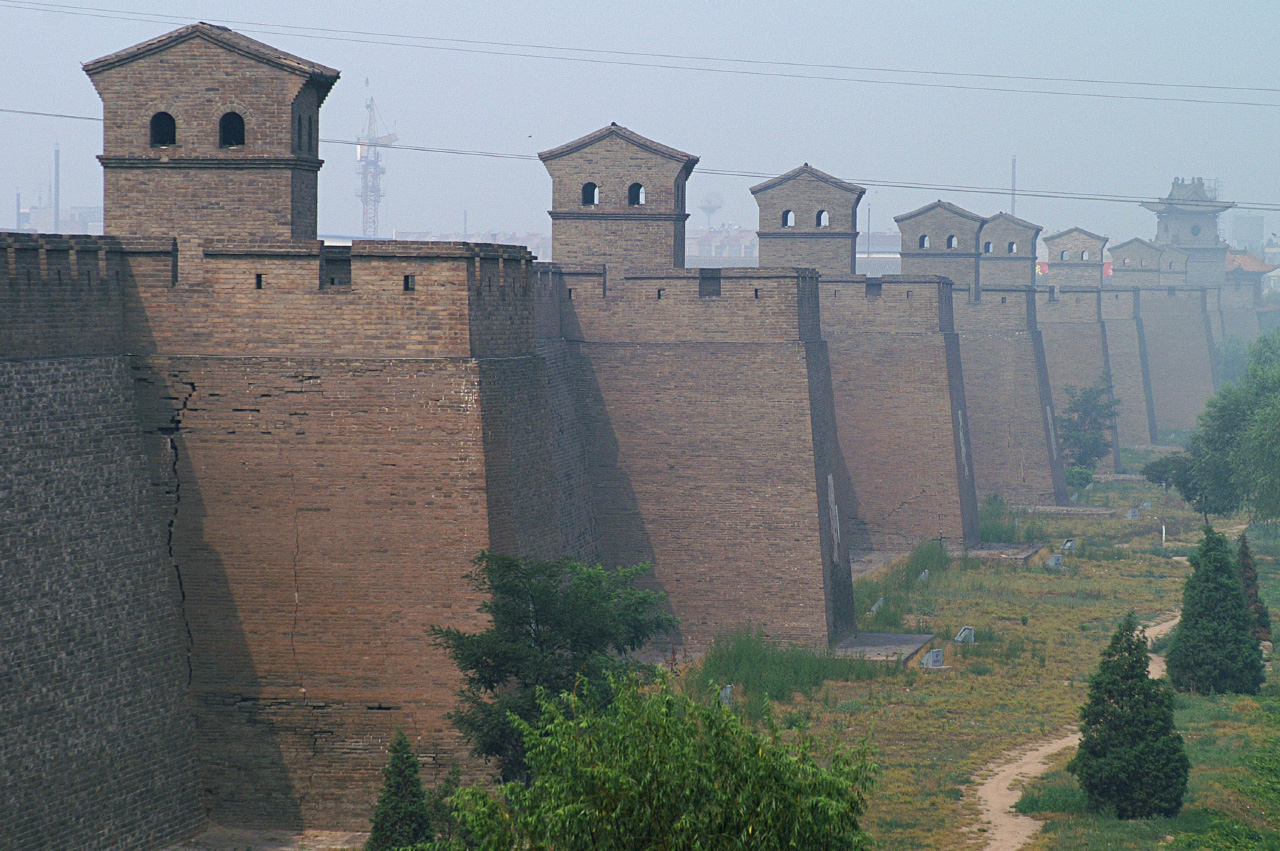
Pingyao (平遥) City Wall

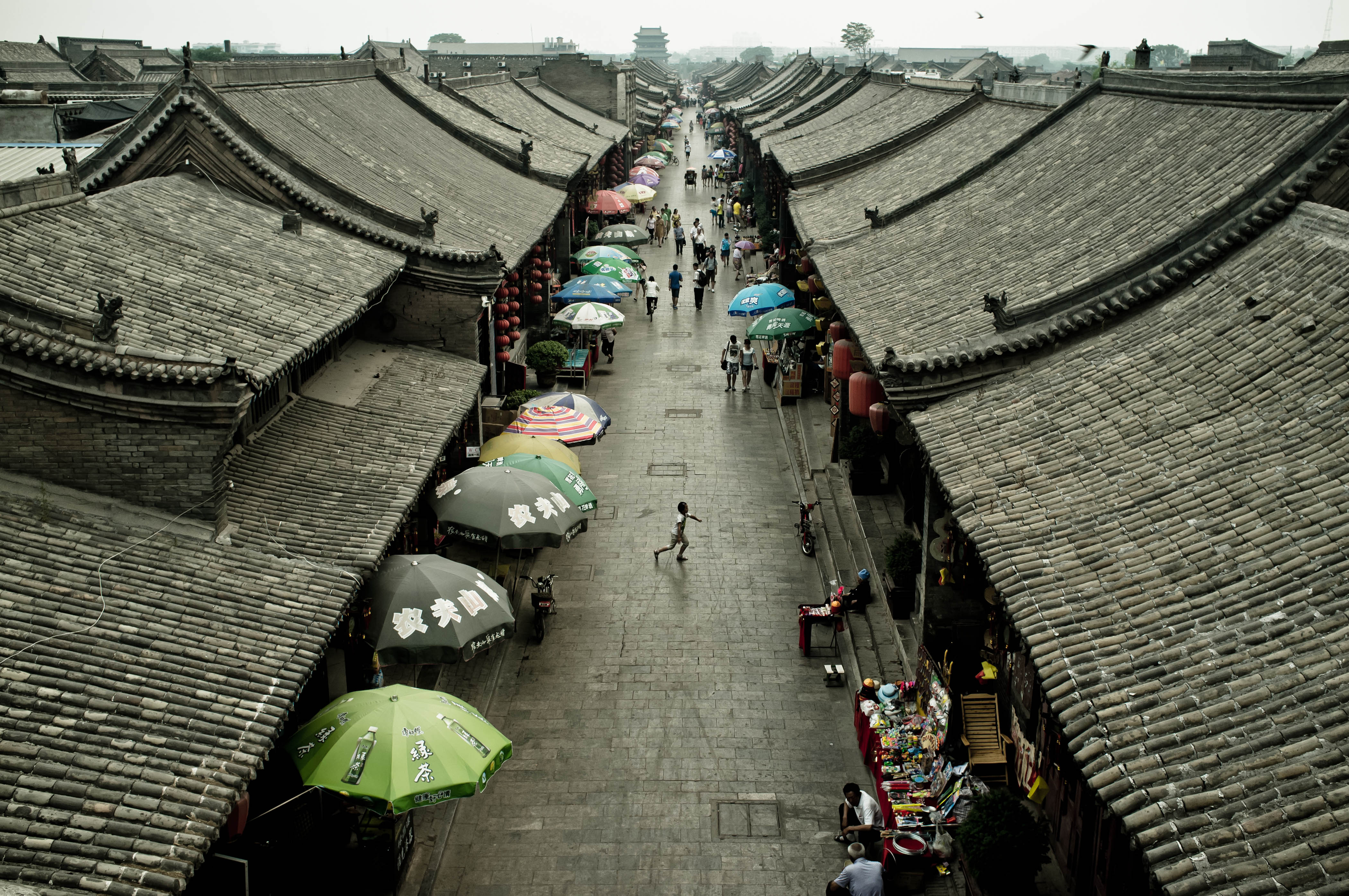
A market street in Pingyao ancient city

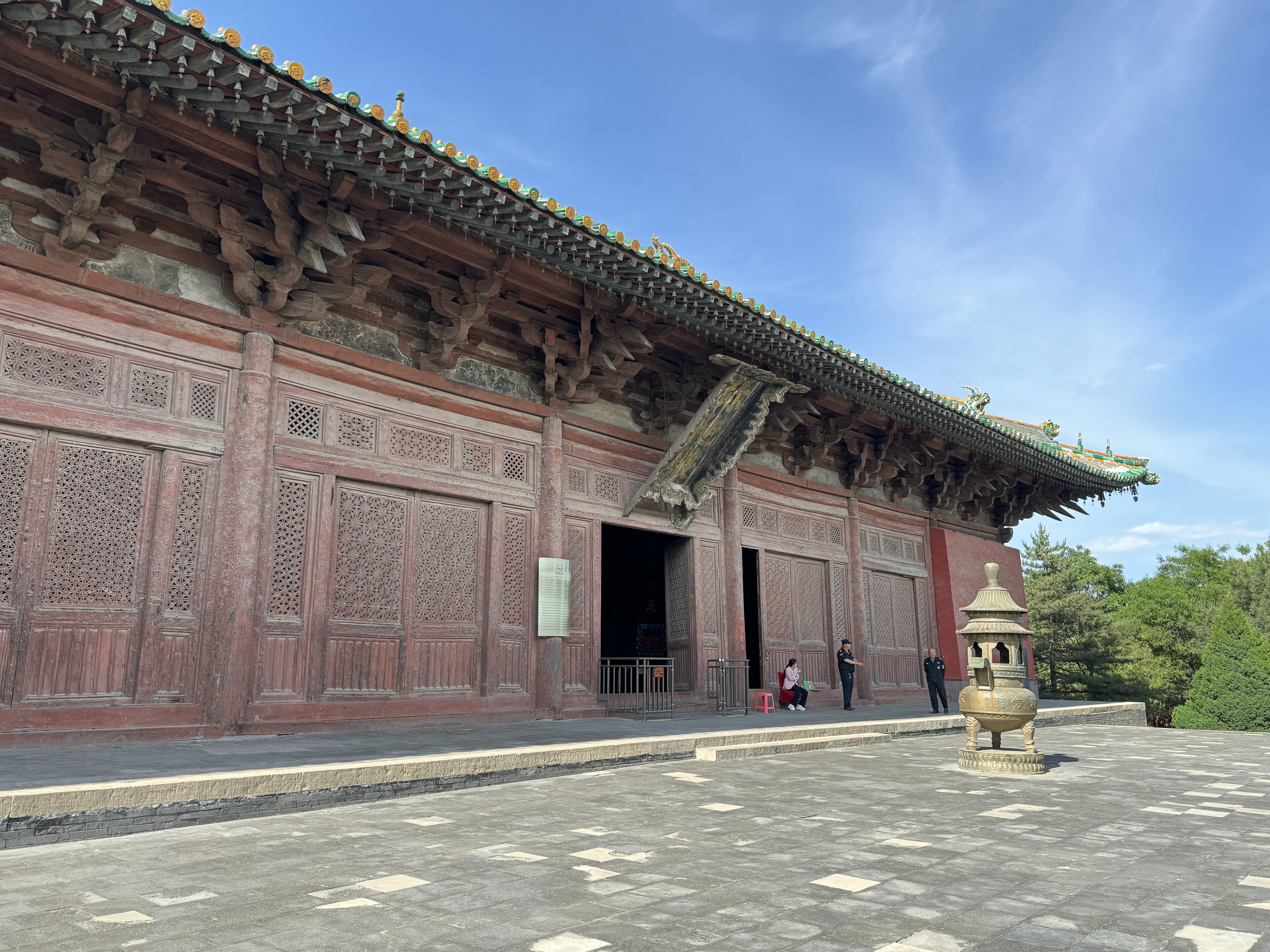
Mita Hall of Chongfu Temple (崇福寺), Shuozhou

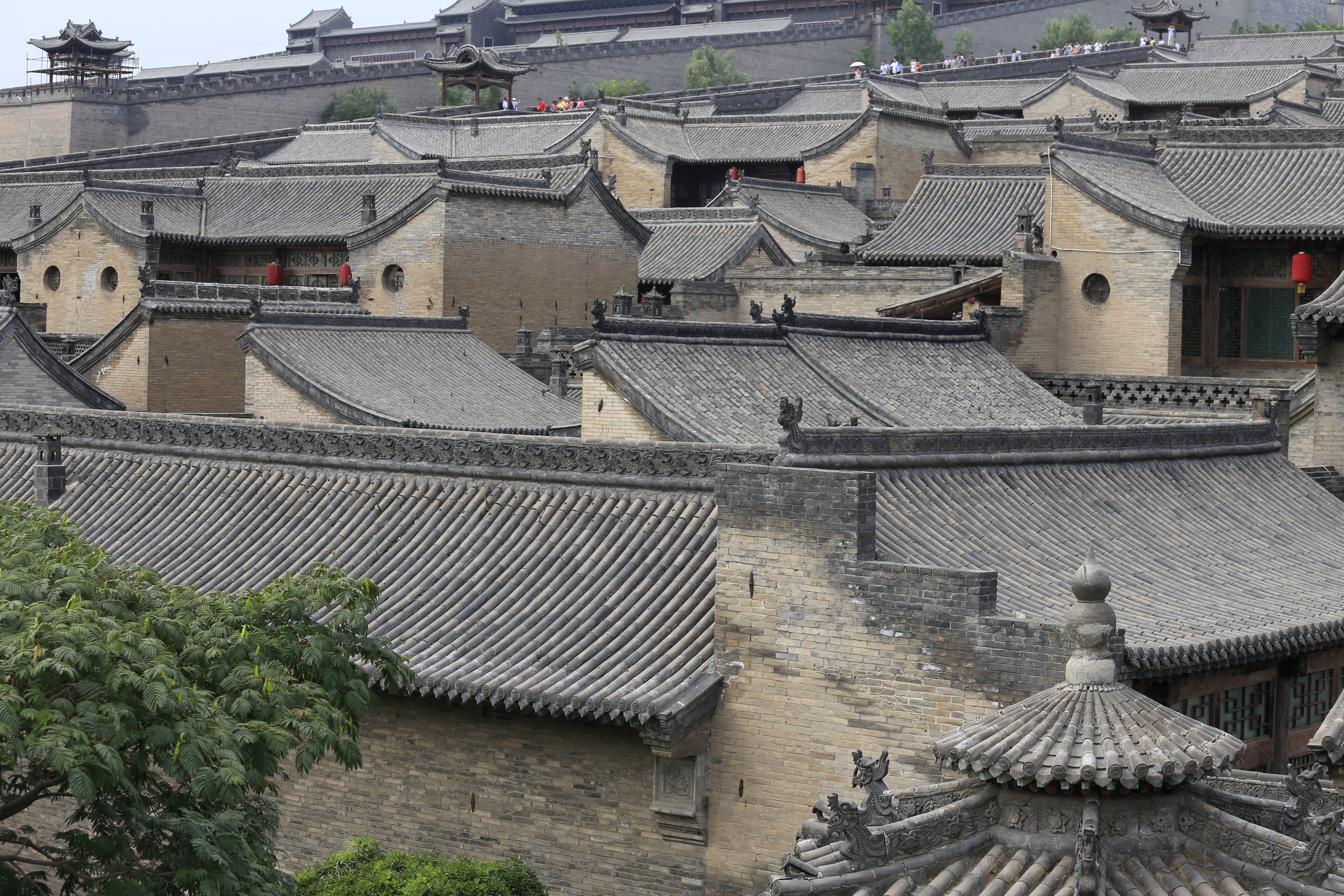
Wang Family Compound (王家大院), in Lingshi

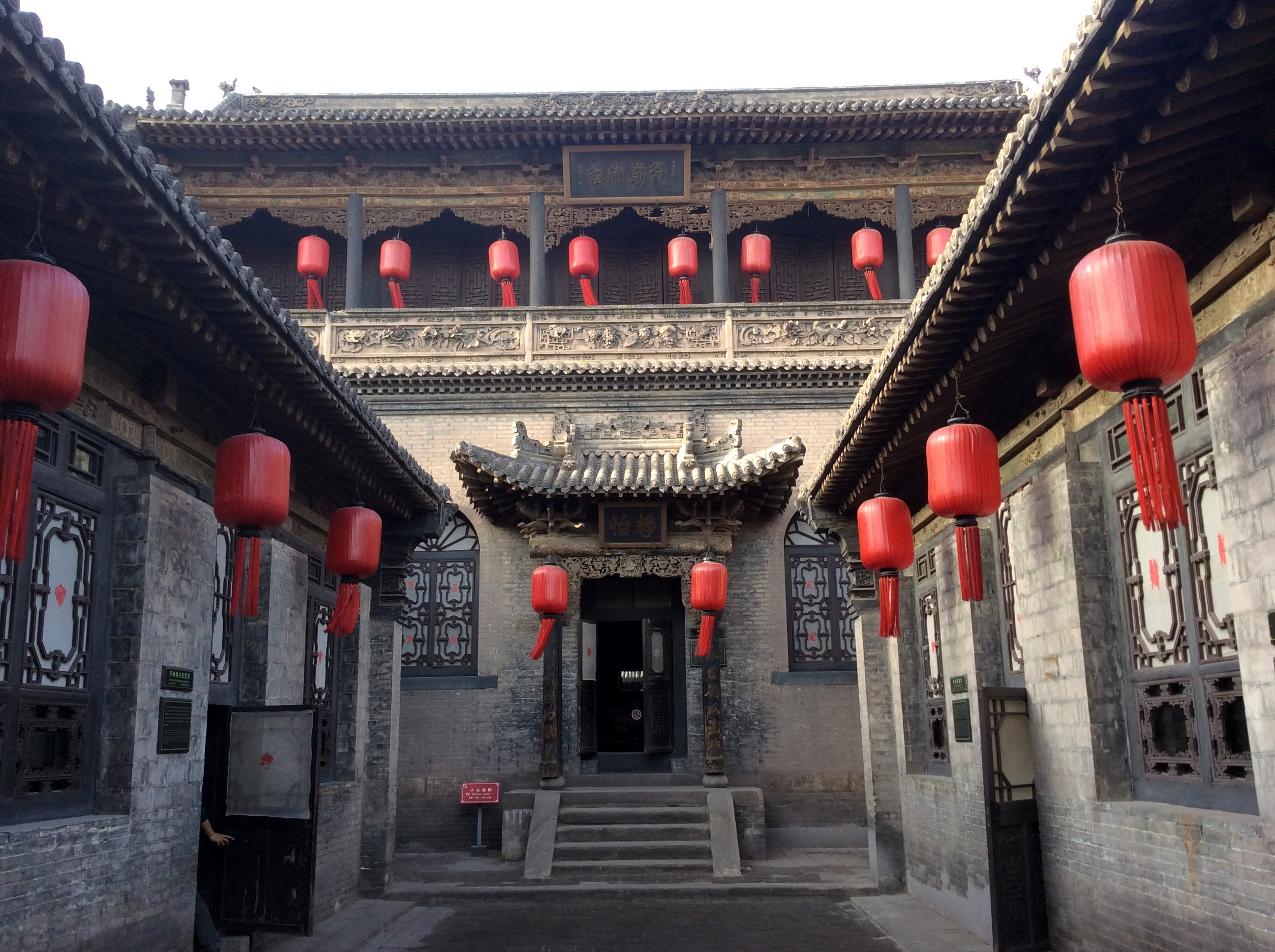
Qiao Family Compound (乔家大院), Jingyi Court in Qi County

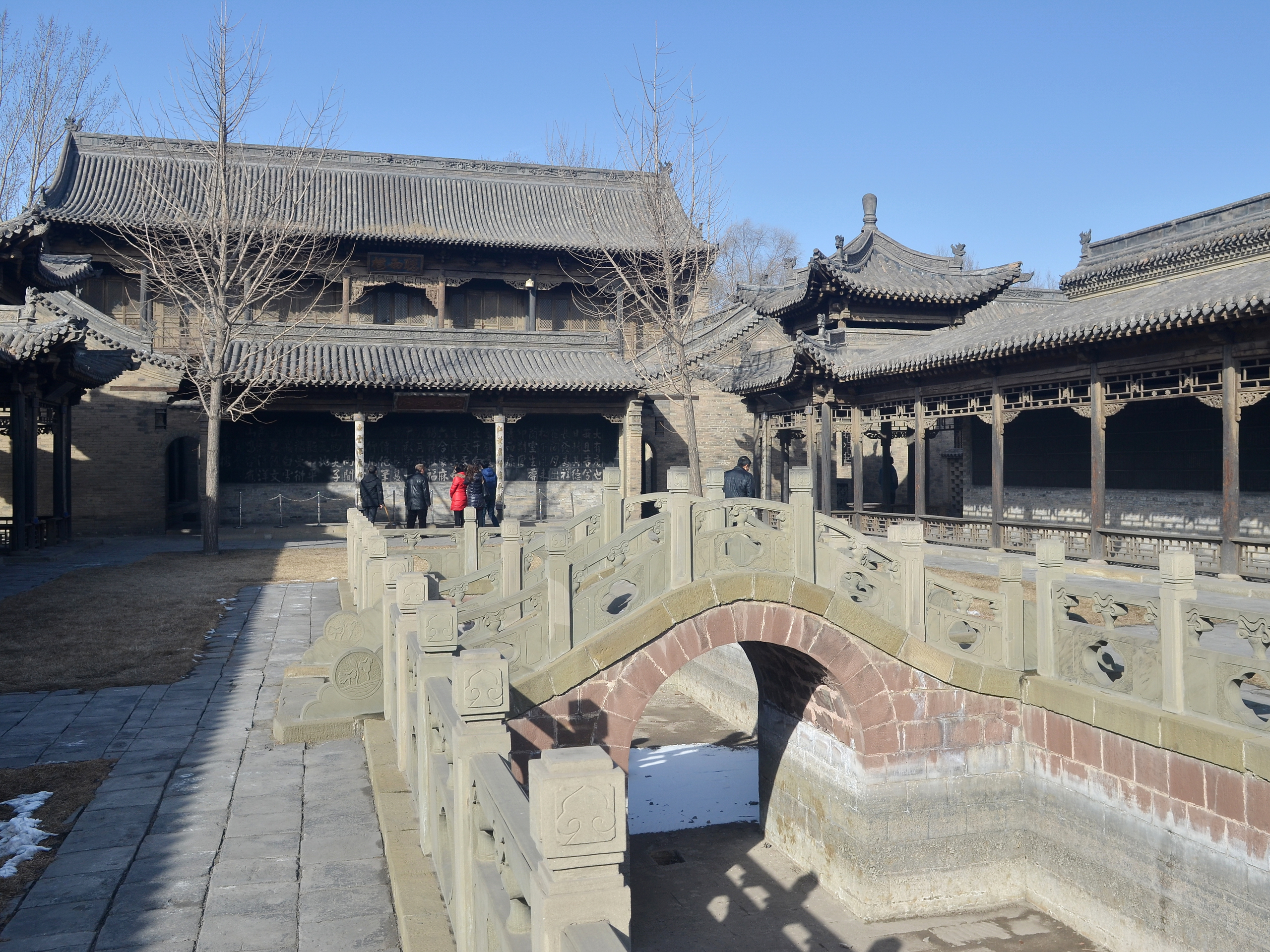
Chang Family Studies, Yuci

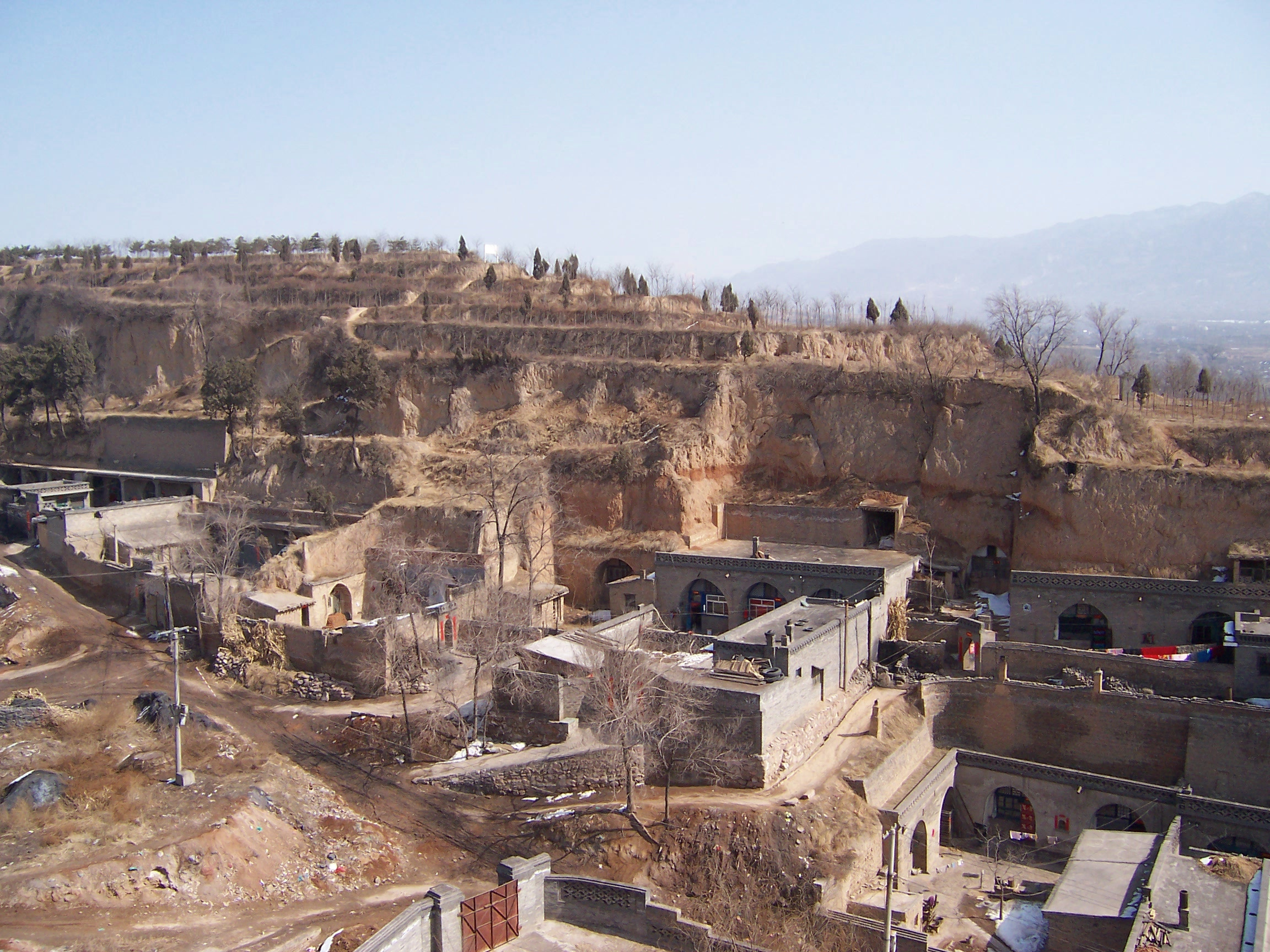
Yaodong (窑洞) in Lingshi (灵石) County, Shanxi

=== Lingnan architecture ===
Classical Lingnan architecture is used primarily in Guangdong and the eastern half of Guangxi. It is noted for its use of carvings and sculptures for decorations, green brick, balconies, "Cold alleys", "Narrow doors", and many other characteristics adaptive to the subtropical region.

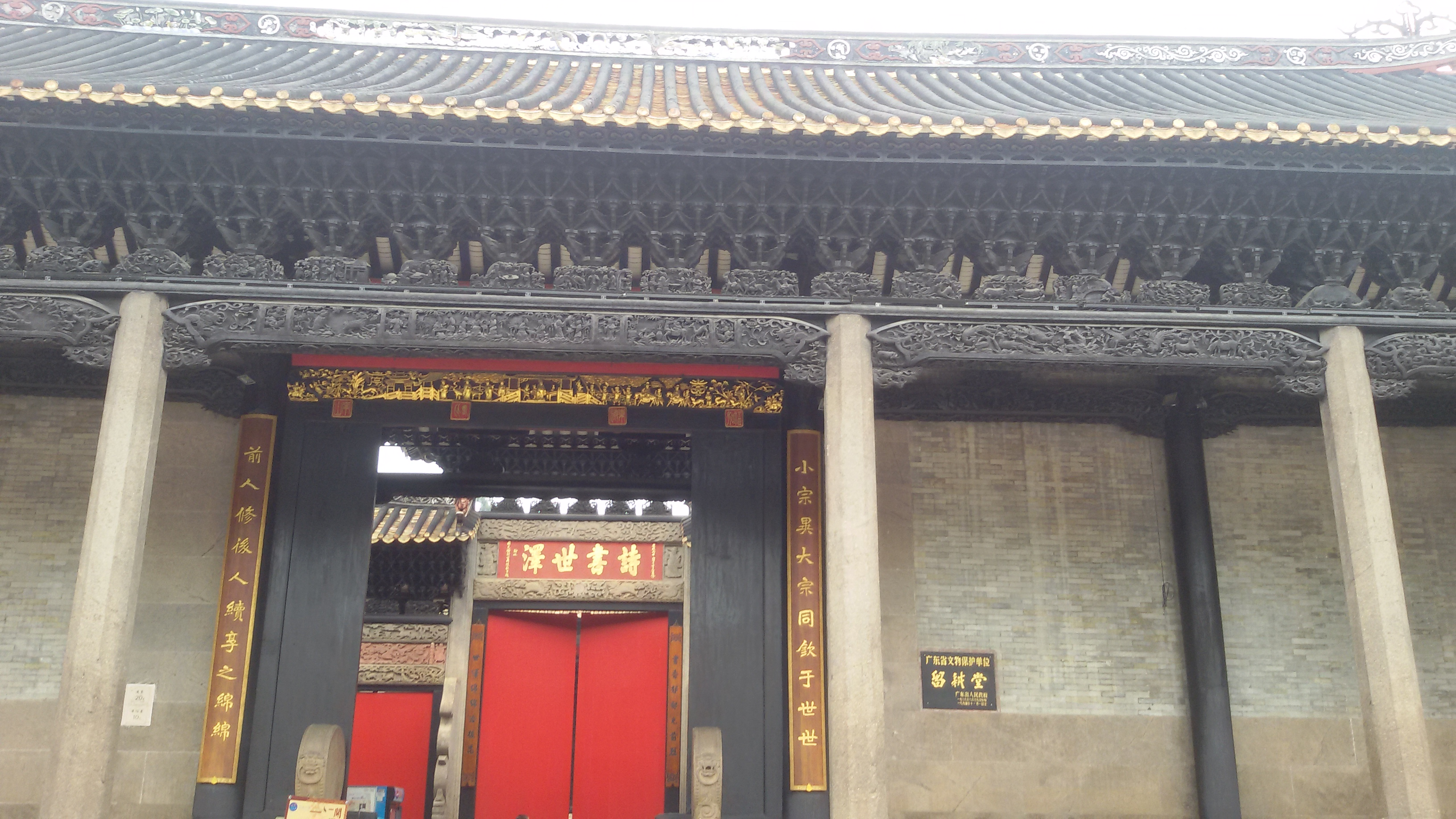
The Ho Ancestral Hall in Panyu, Guangzhou; Built in 14th century, it utilizes manner door – a second door behind the main one, which is related to Cantonese Feng shui culture.

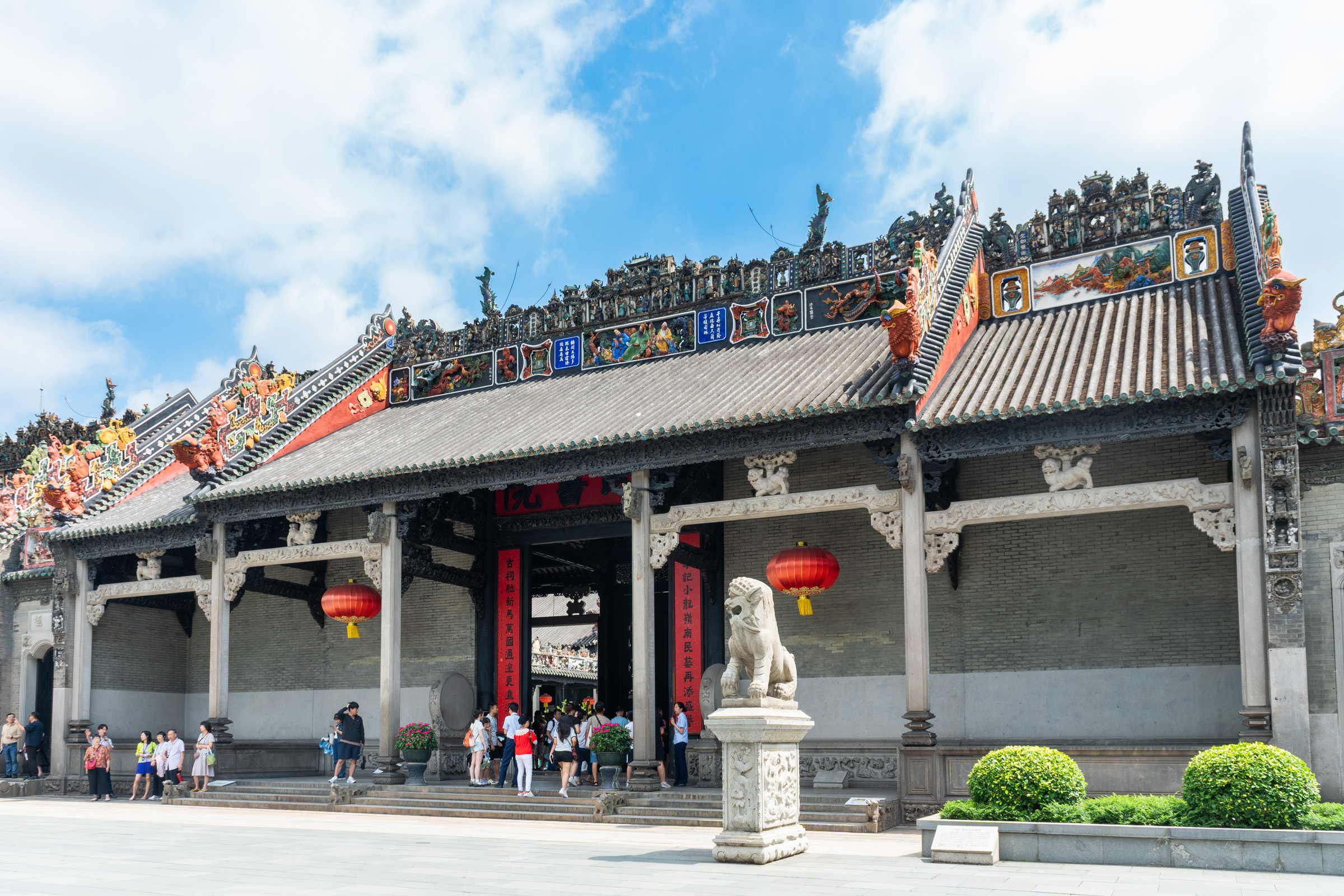
Chan Clan Academy in Guangzhou is often cited as a representative example of Lingnan architecture.

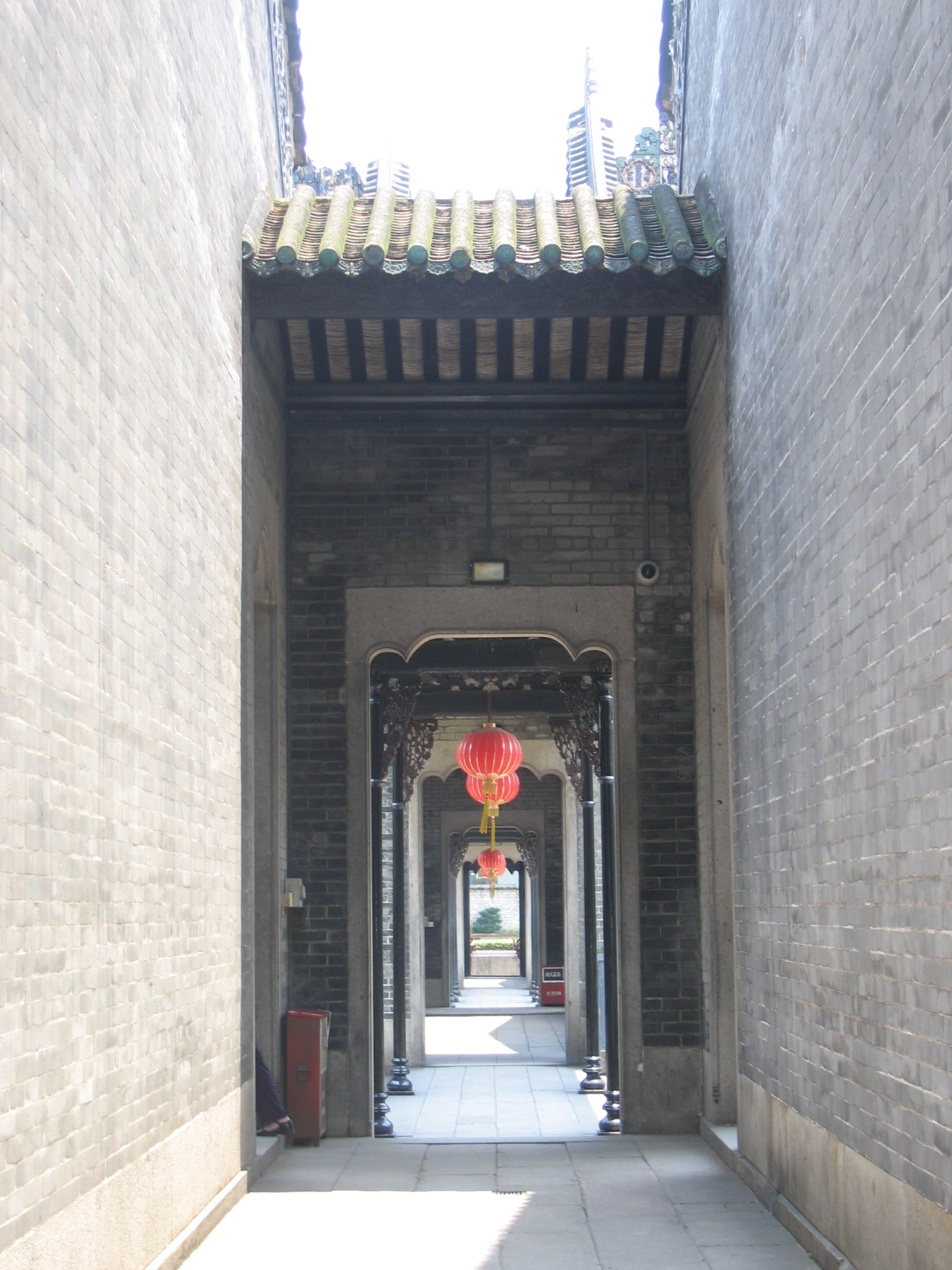
A cold alley in Chan Clan Academy; A "Narrow Door" leads to the next alley.

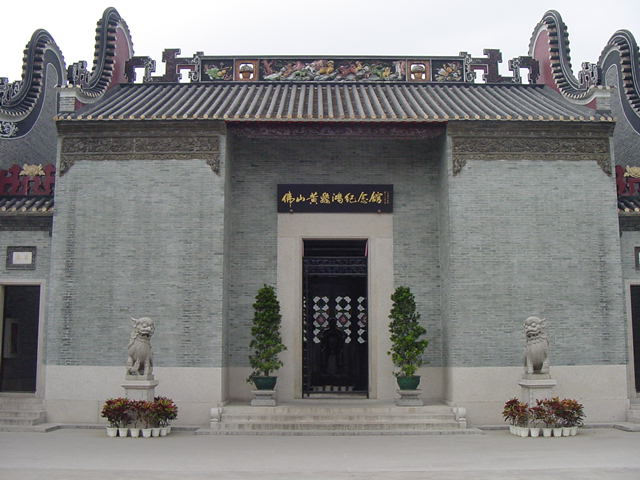
A monument in honor of the Cantonese folk hero Wong Fei-hung, in Foshan.

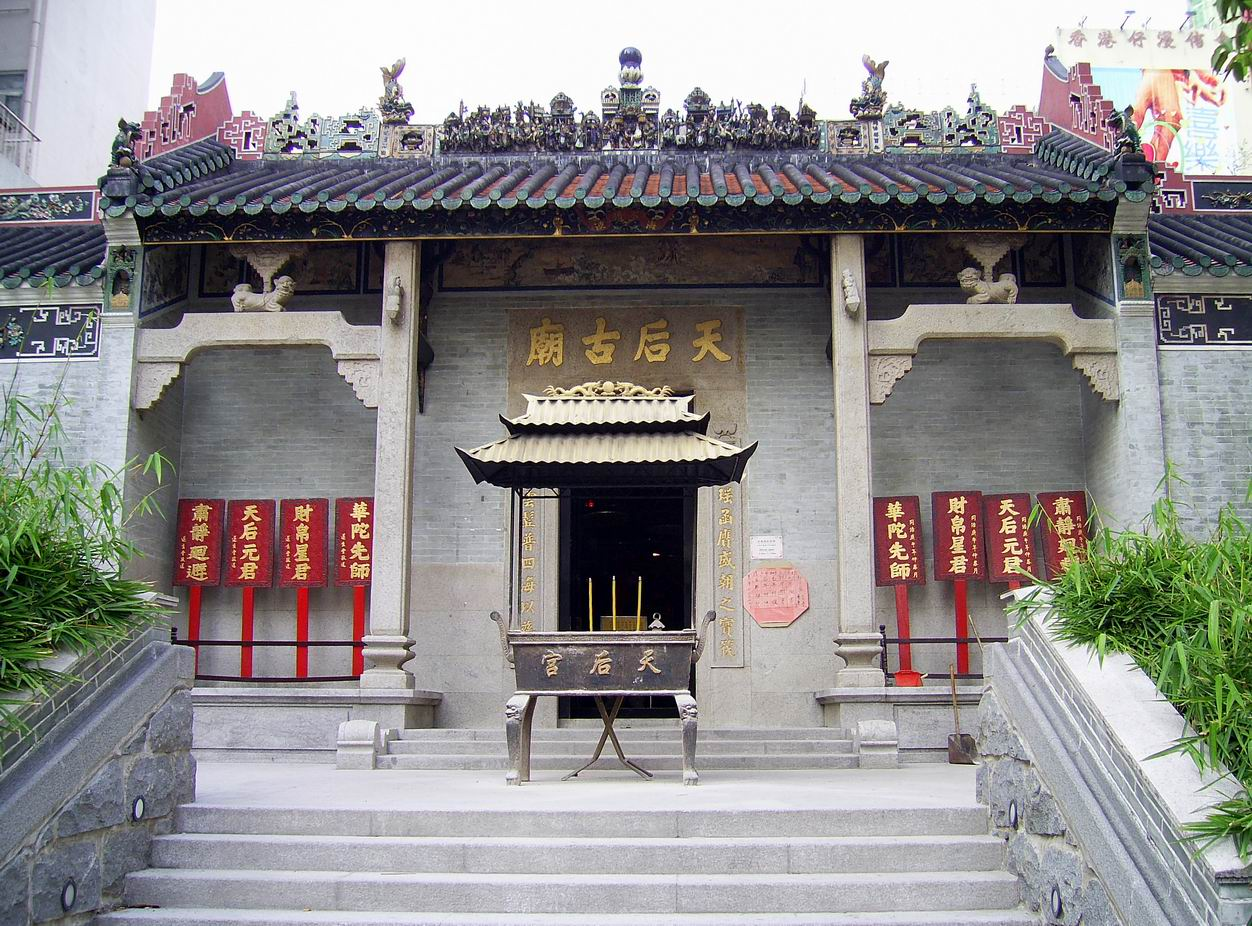
Most Hongkongers are of Cantonese origin. Thus, Hong Kong naturally has a lot of buildings of classical Lingnan style. Pictured is a Mazu temple in Shek Pai Wan, Hong Kong.

=== Hokkien architecture ===
Hokkien architecture, refers to the architectural style of the Hoklo people, the Han Chinese group who are the dominant demographic of Southern Fujian and Taiwan. This style is noted for its use of swallowtail roofs (heavily decorated upward-curving roof ridges) and "cut porcelain carving" for decorations. The swallowtail roof is a signature of Hokkien architecture, commonly used for religious buildings like shrines and temples, but also in dwellings. Hokkien architecture is dominated by decorations from carvings of natural elements like plants and animals, or figures from Chinese mythology.

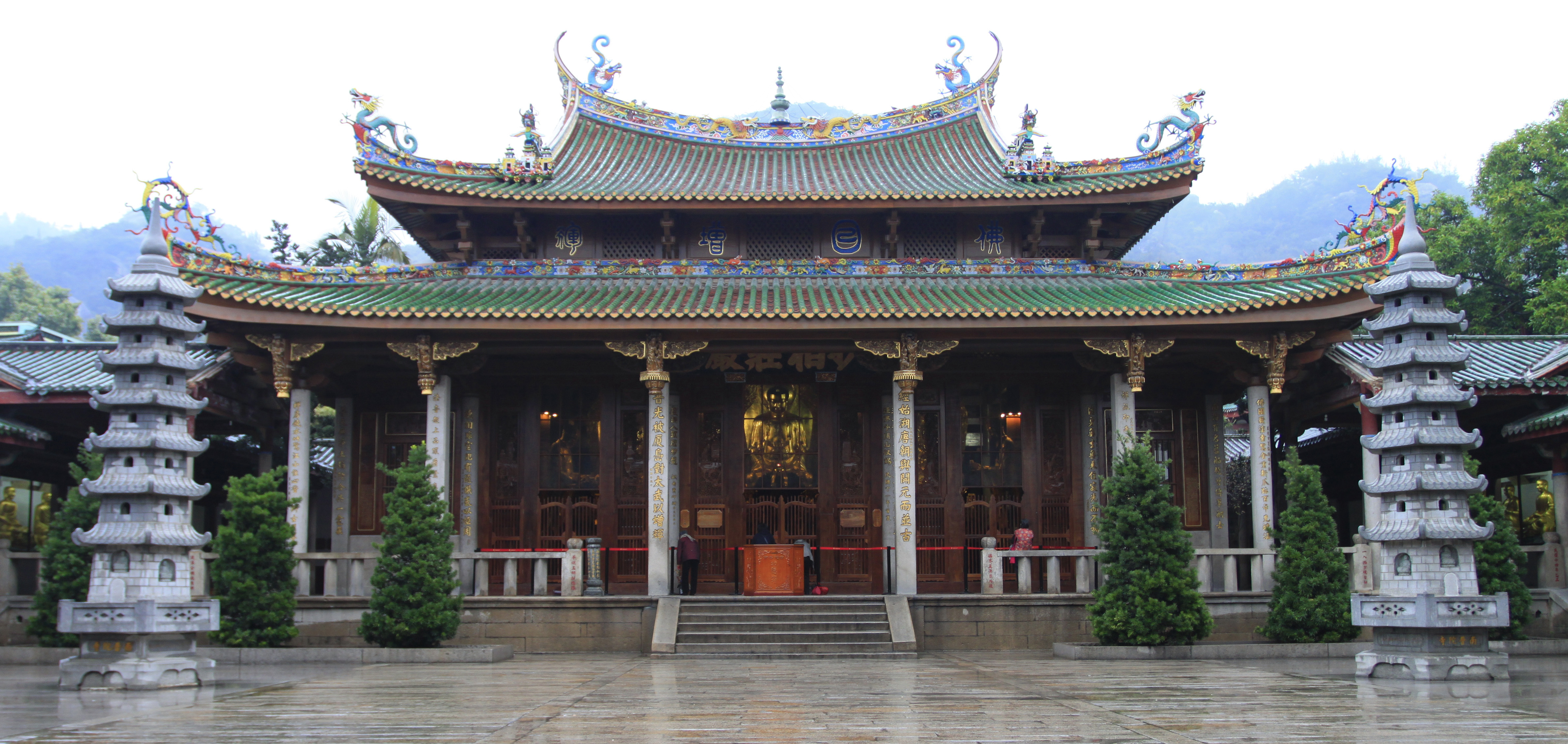
Nanputuo Temple, Xiamen

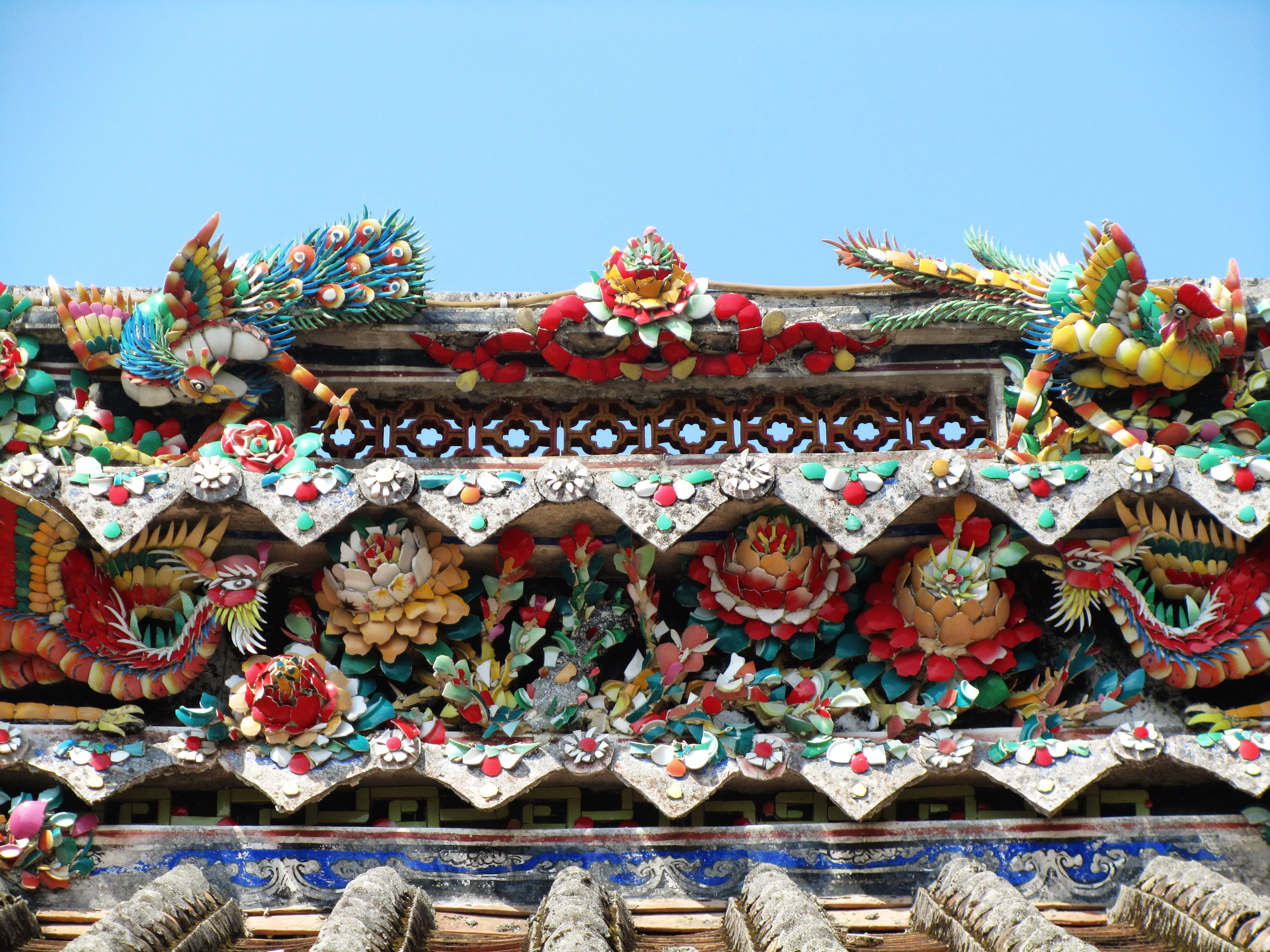
Cut porcelain carving decorations above the main door of Nanfeng Ancestral Temple.

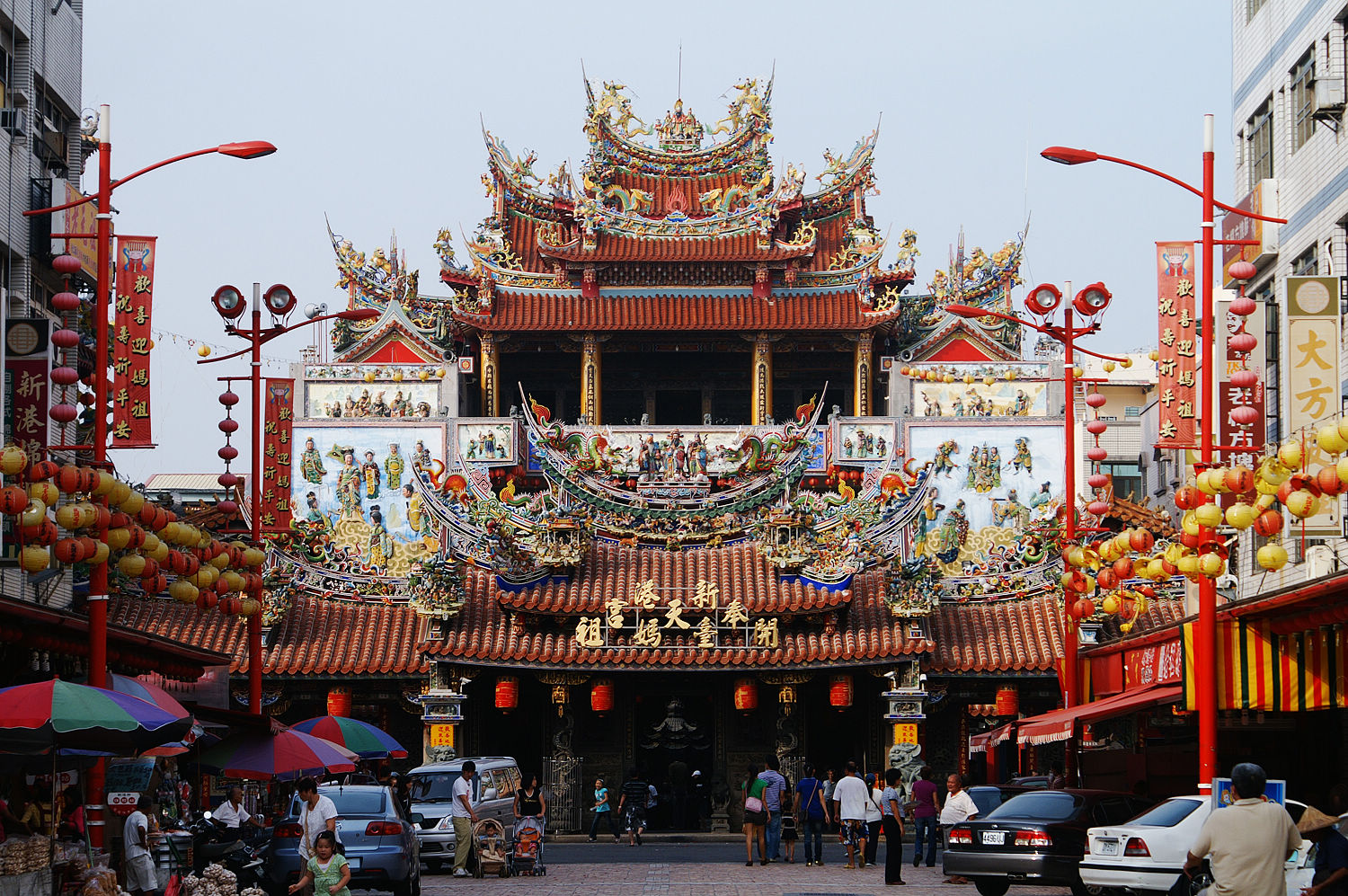
A Mazu temple in Chiayi City, Taiwan.

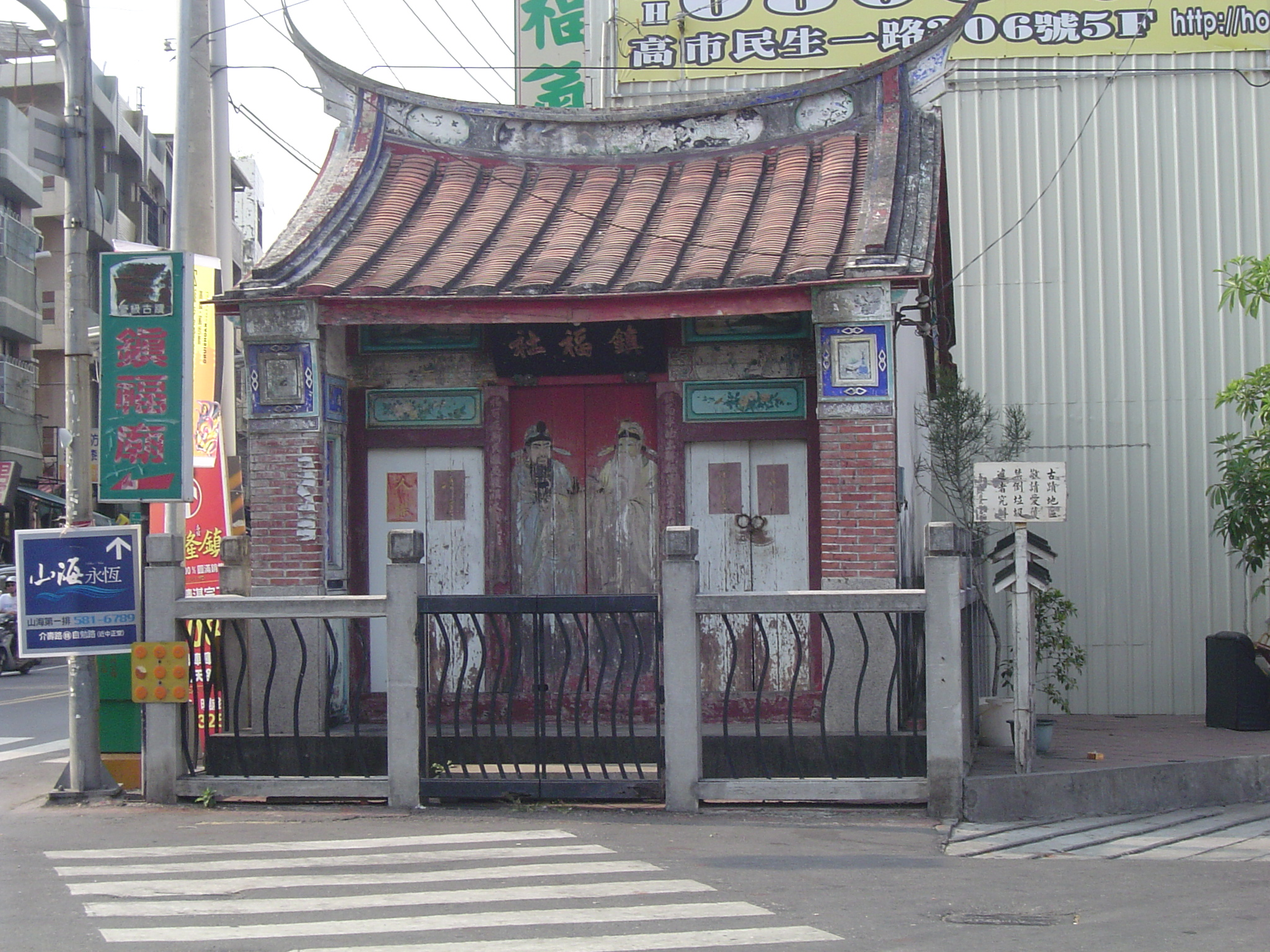
A shrine for Tudigong, a Taoist earth deity, in Kaohsiung, Taiwan; It is an example of a less garish swallowtail roof.

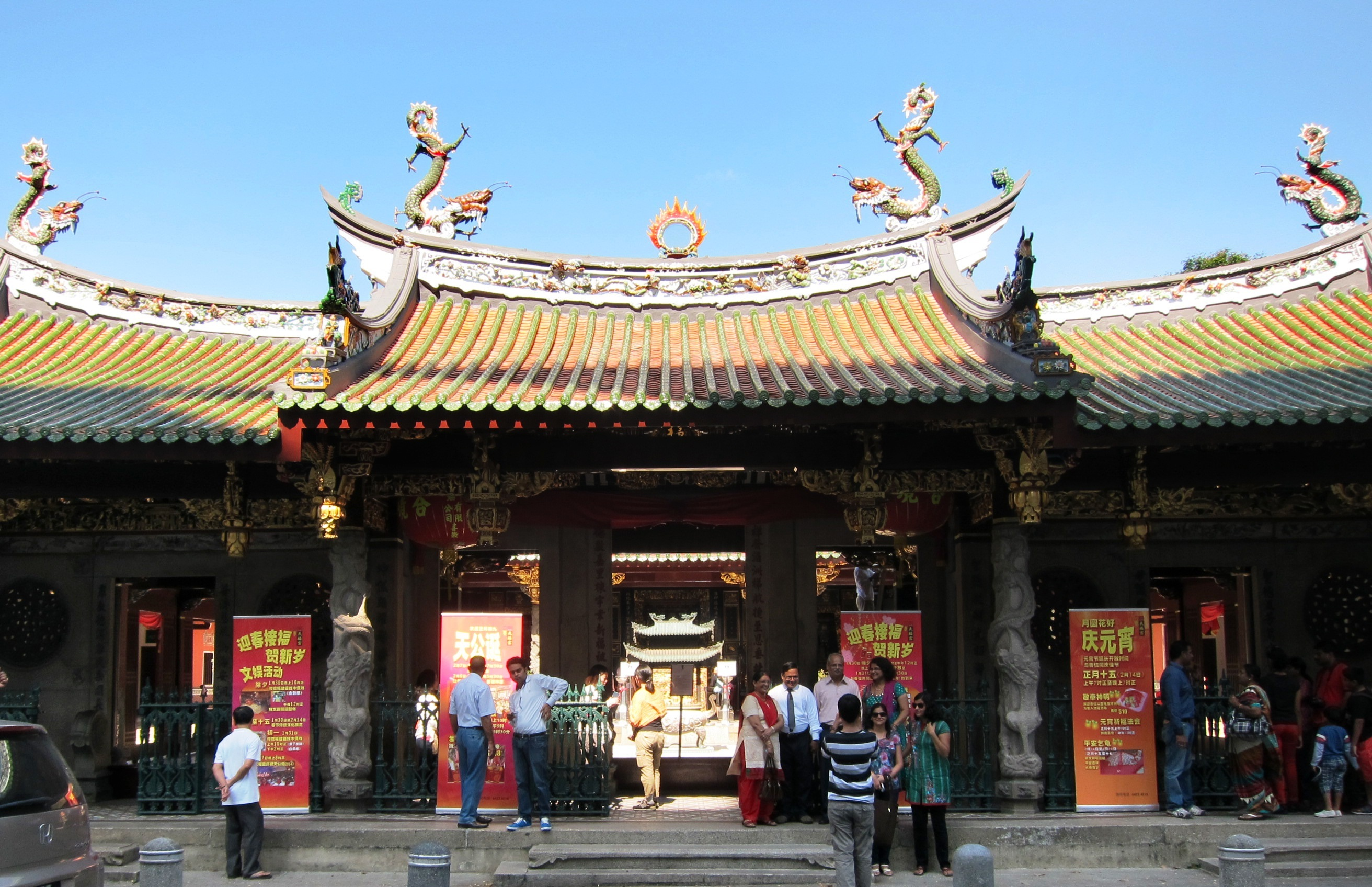
Front entrance of Thian Hock Keng Temple, Singapore.

=== Teochew architecture ===
Teochew architectural is the architectural style of the Teochew people, who come from the Chaoshan region of Guangdong province. Teochew architecture is categorised by its "curly grass roofs" (with the ridges curving into a loop) and wood carvings, and share the "cut porcelain carving" tradition with the closely related Hokkien people.

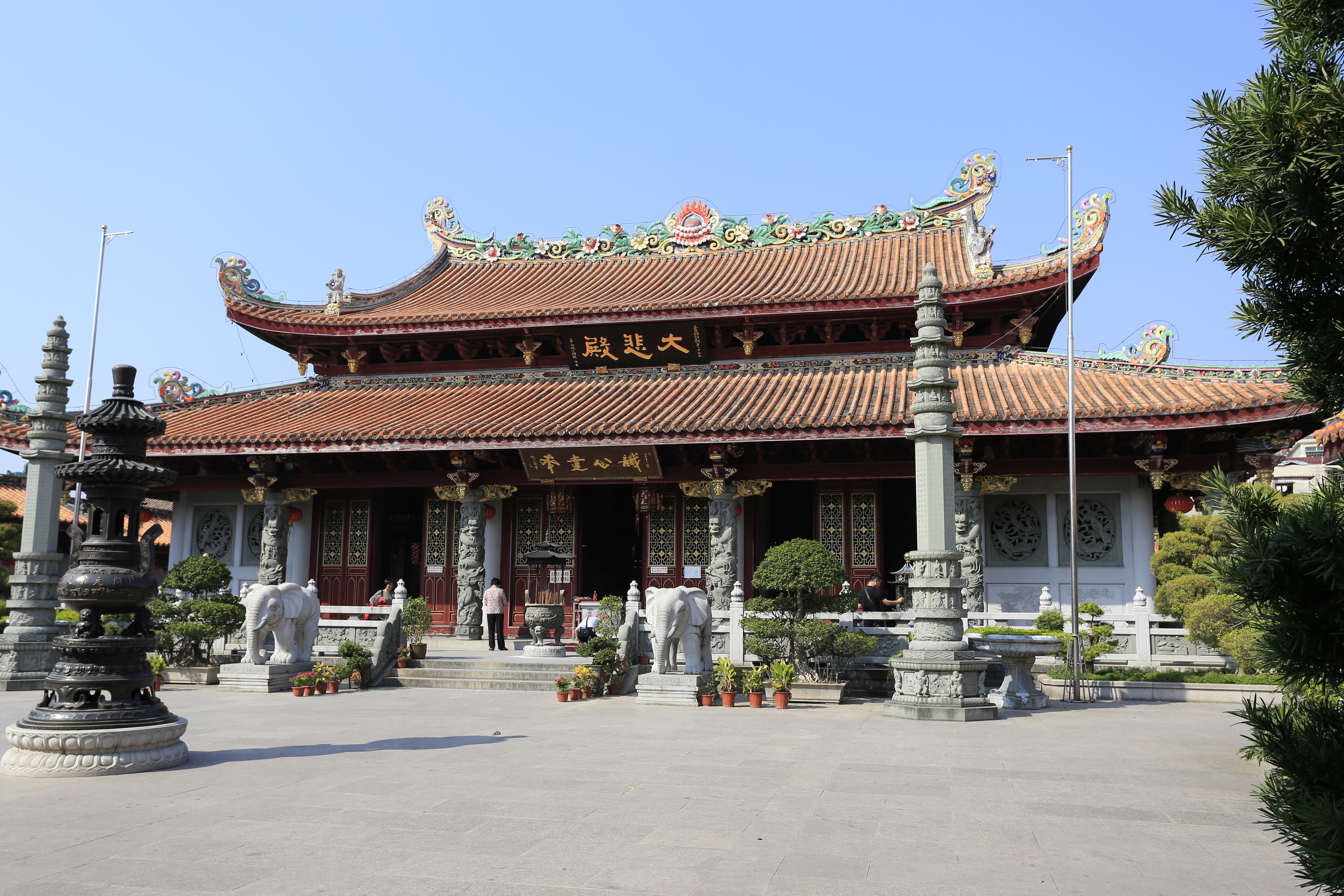
Kaiyuan Temple, Chaozhou

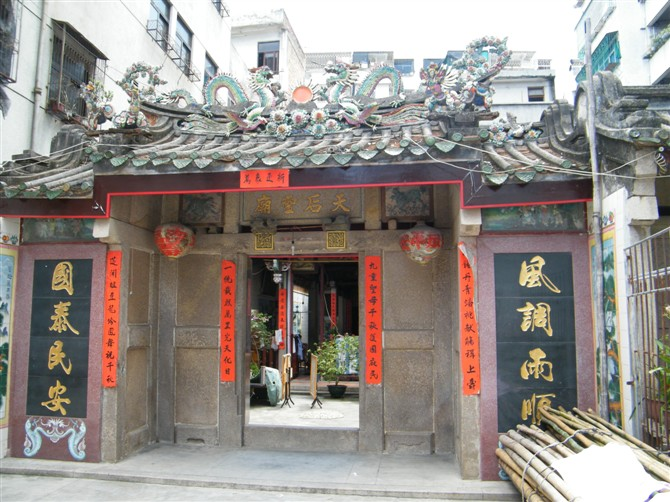
Mazu temple in Dahao

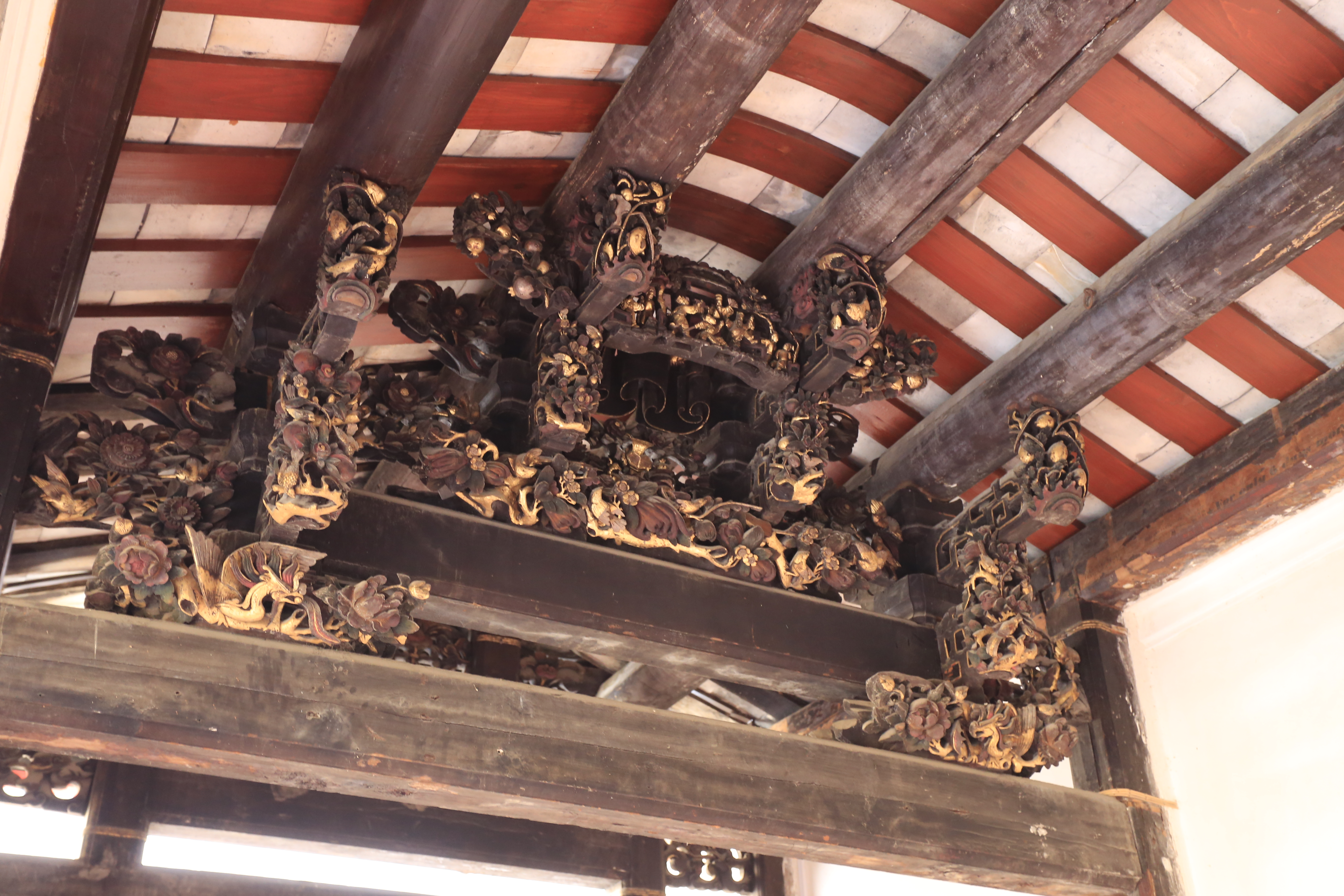
Wood carvings on an ancestral temple in Chaozhou

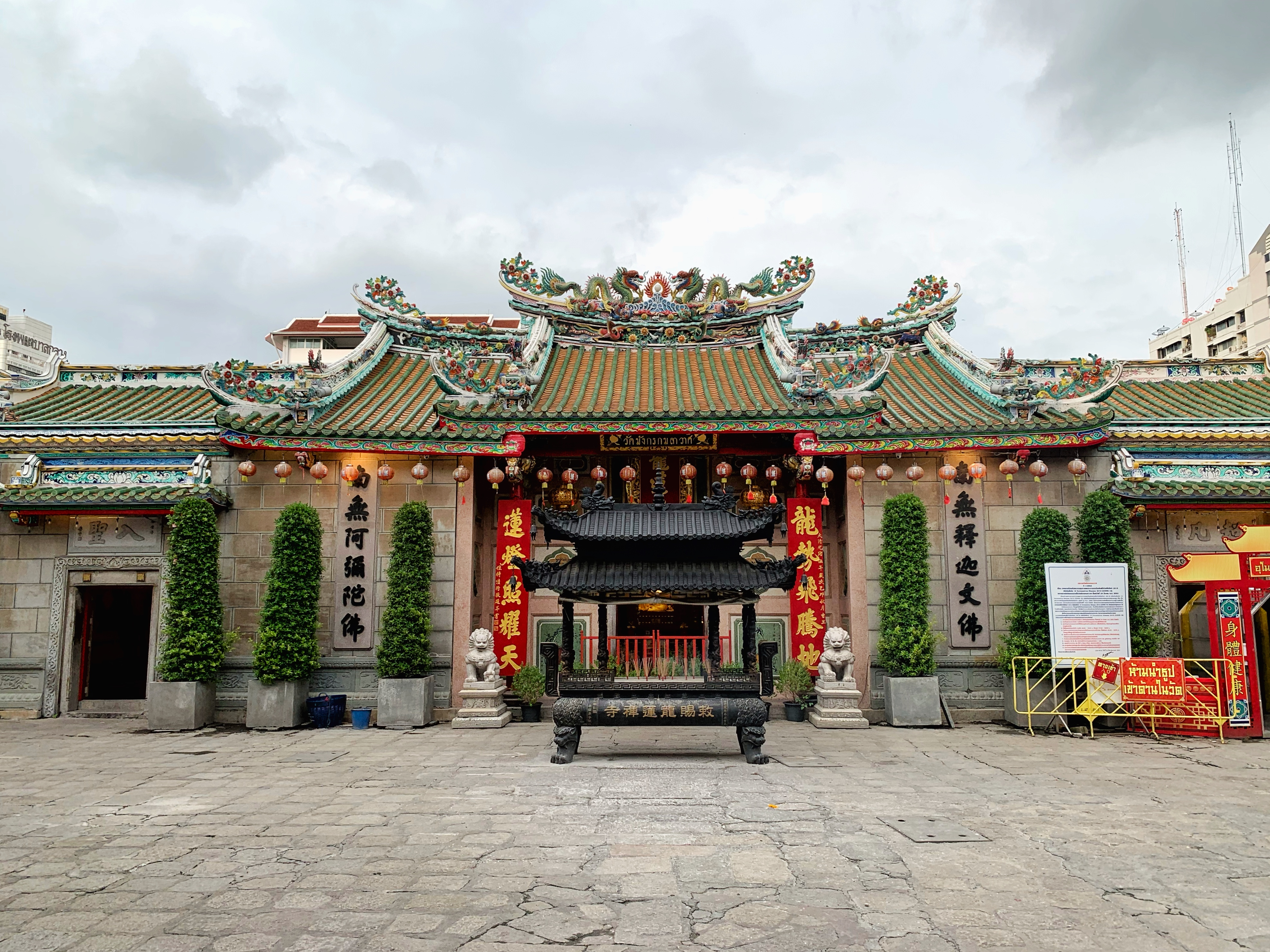
Wat Mangkon Kamalawat, a Teochew-style Temple in Bangkok Chinatown; most Thai-Chinese are of Teochew descent

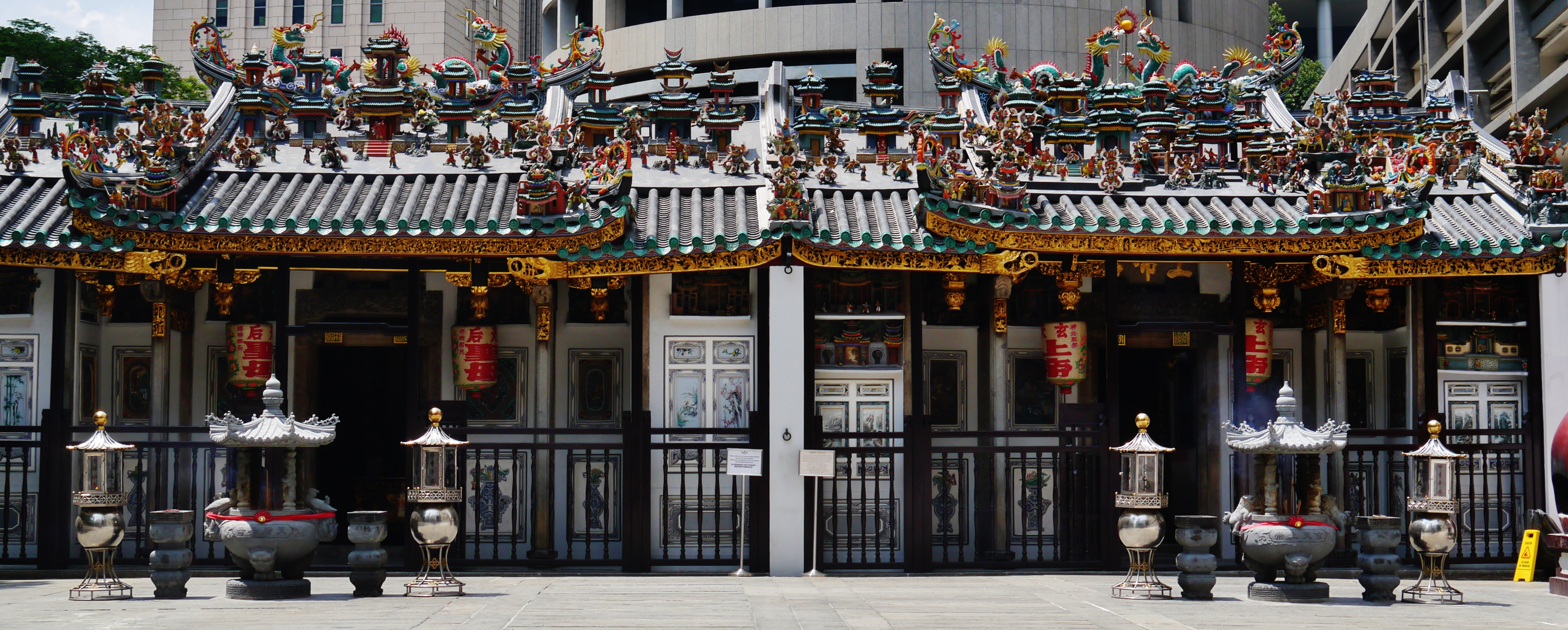
Yueh Hai Ching Temple, Singapore's oldest Teochew temple

=== Hakka architecture ===
Hakka people are noted for building distinctive walled villages in order to protect themselves from clan wars.

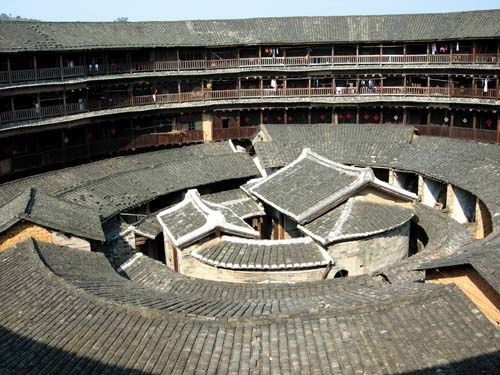

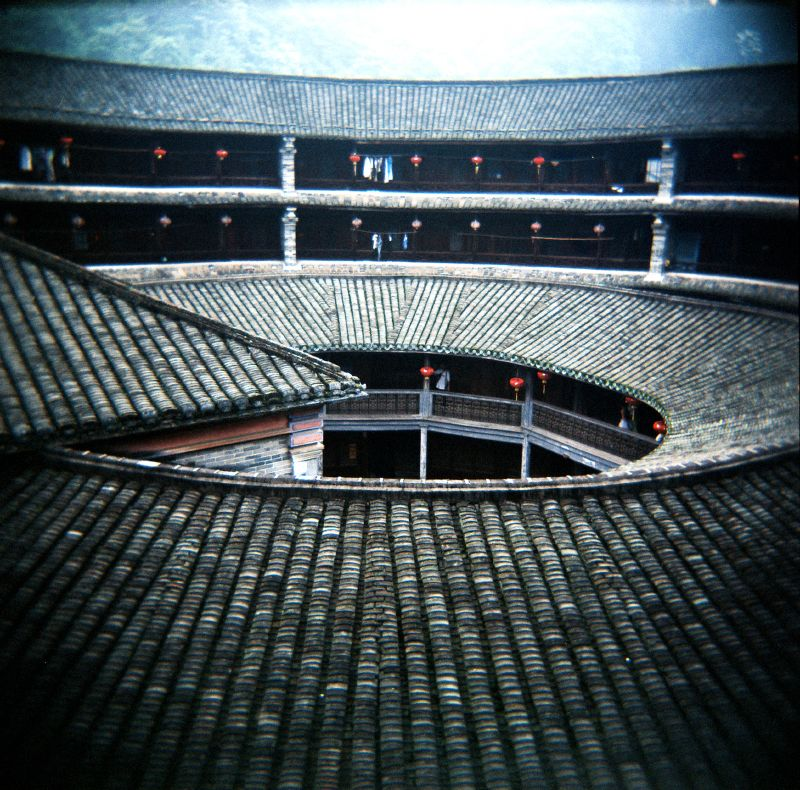

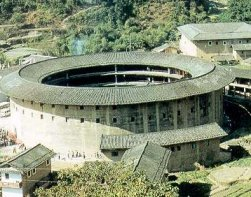

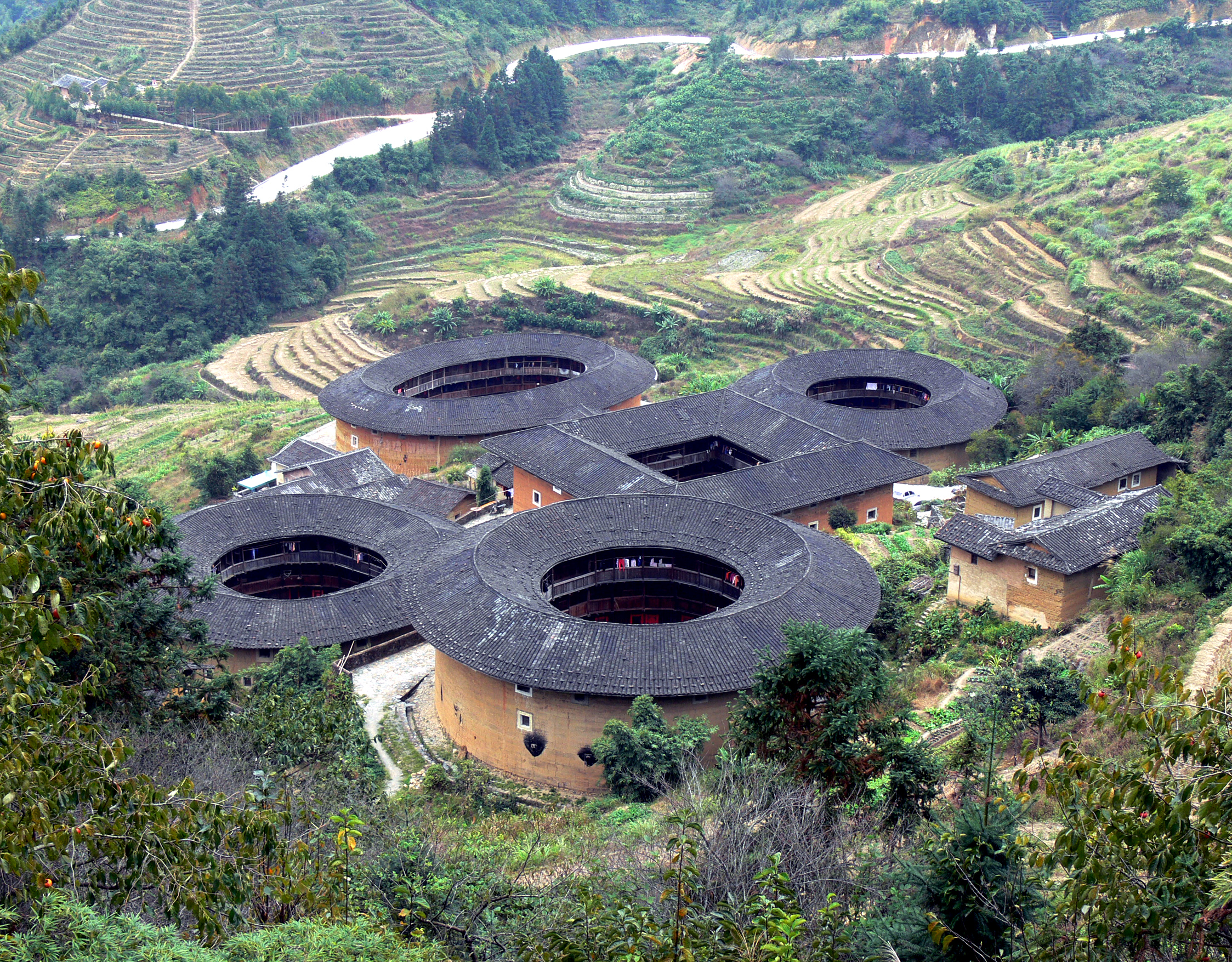

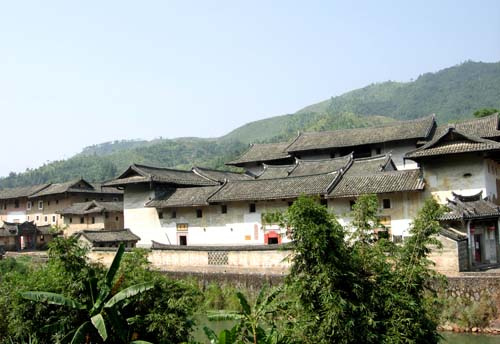

=== Gan architecture ===
The Gan Chinese-speaking province of Jiangxi makes use of bricks, wood, and stones as materials, primarily using wooden frames.

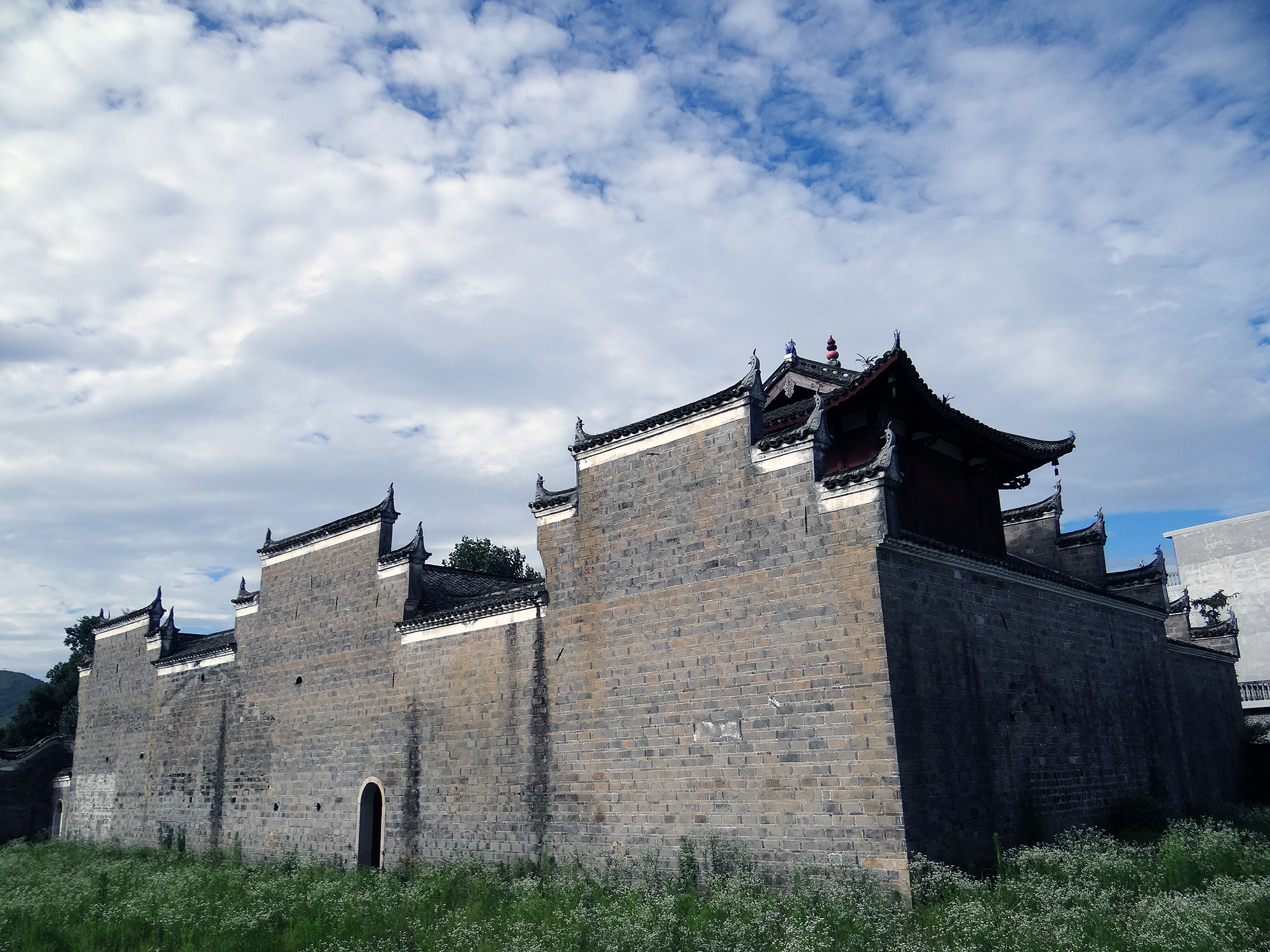
Confucian academy in Fuzhou

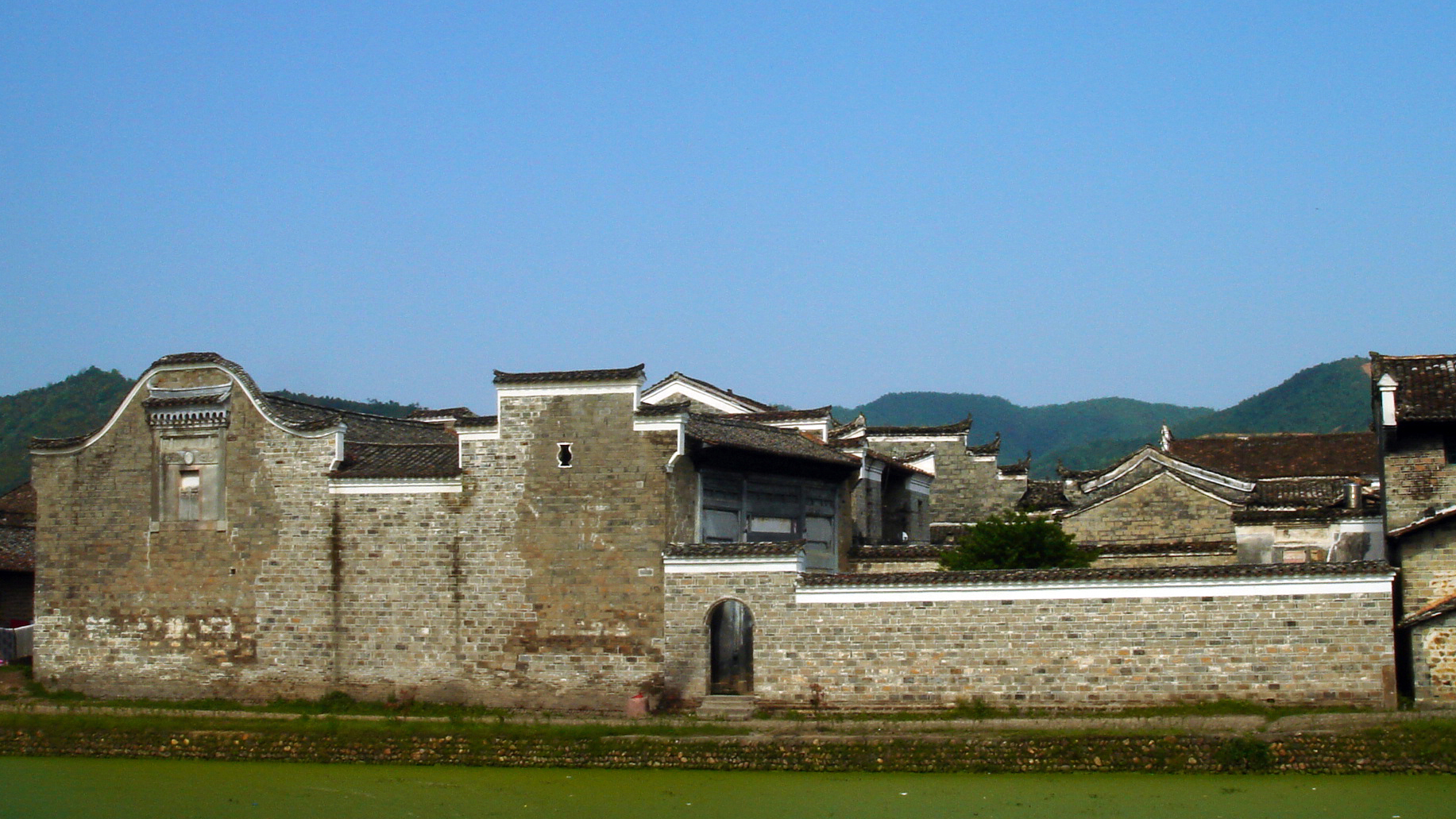
Jiangxi's indigenous architecture – Liukeng village.

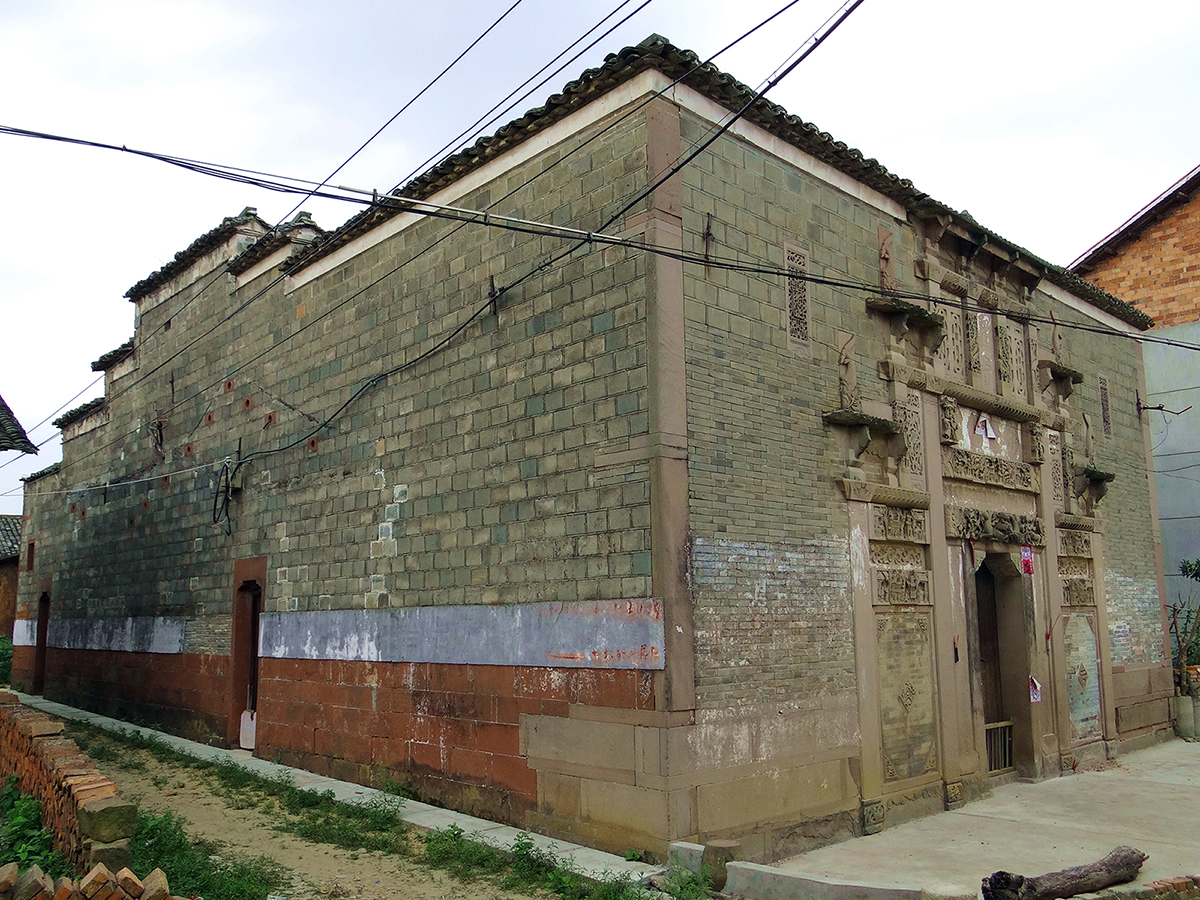
A "Pai tau uk" (牌頭屋) in Nanchang, Jiangxi.

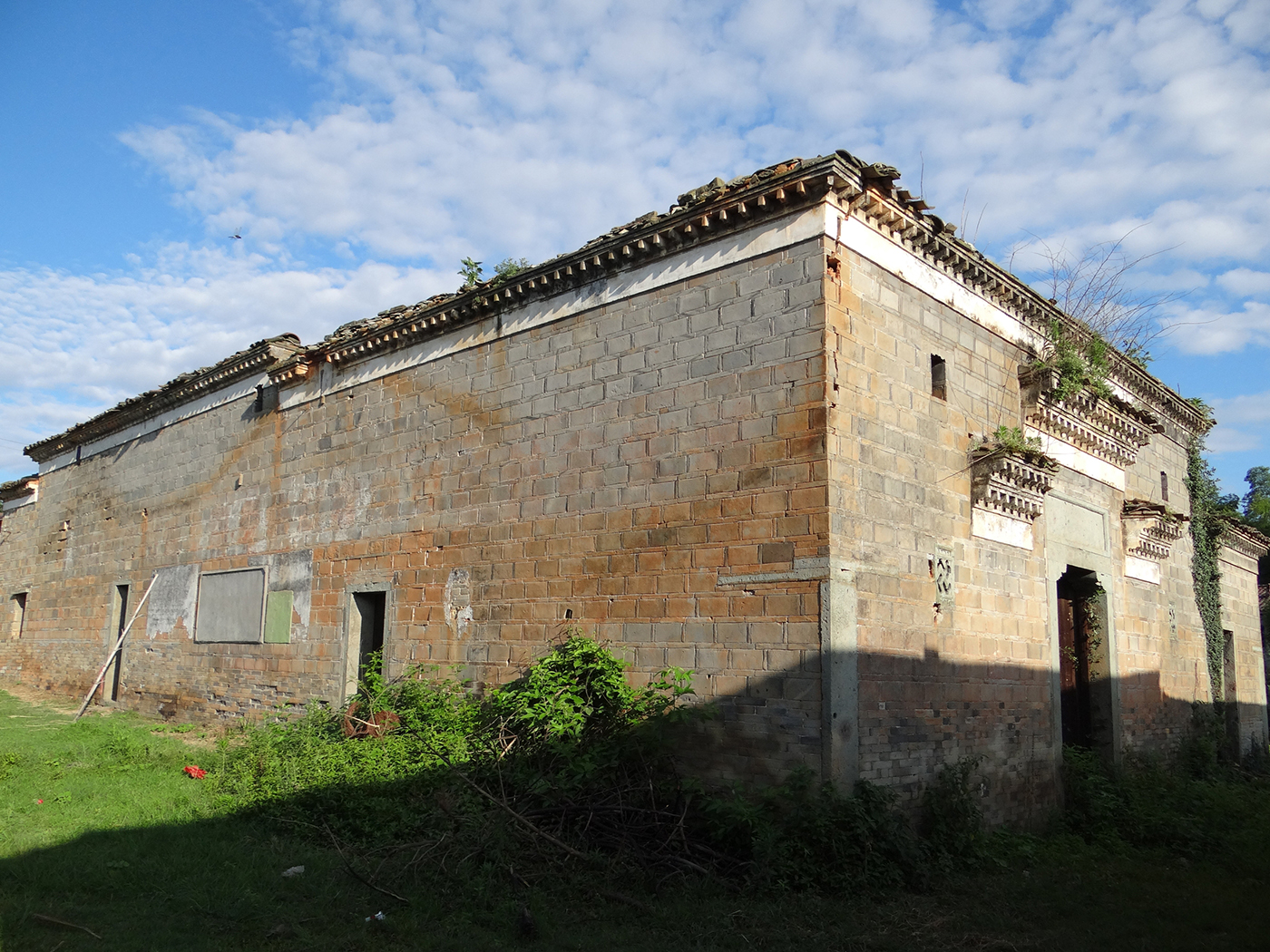
A residence in Jinxi county, Fuzhou.

=== Sui architecture ===
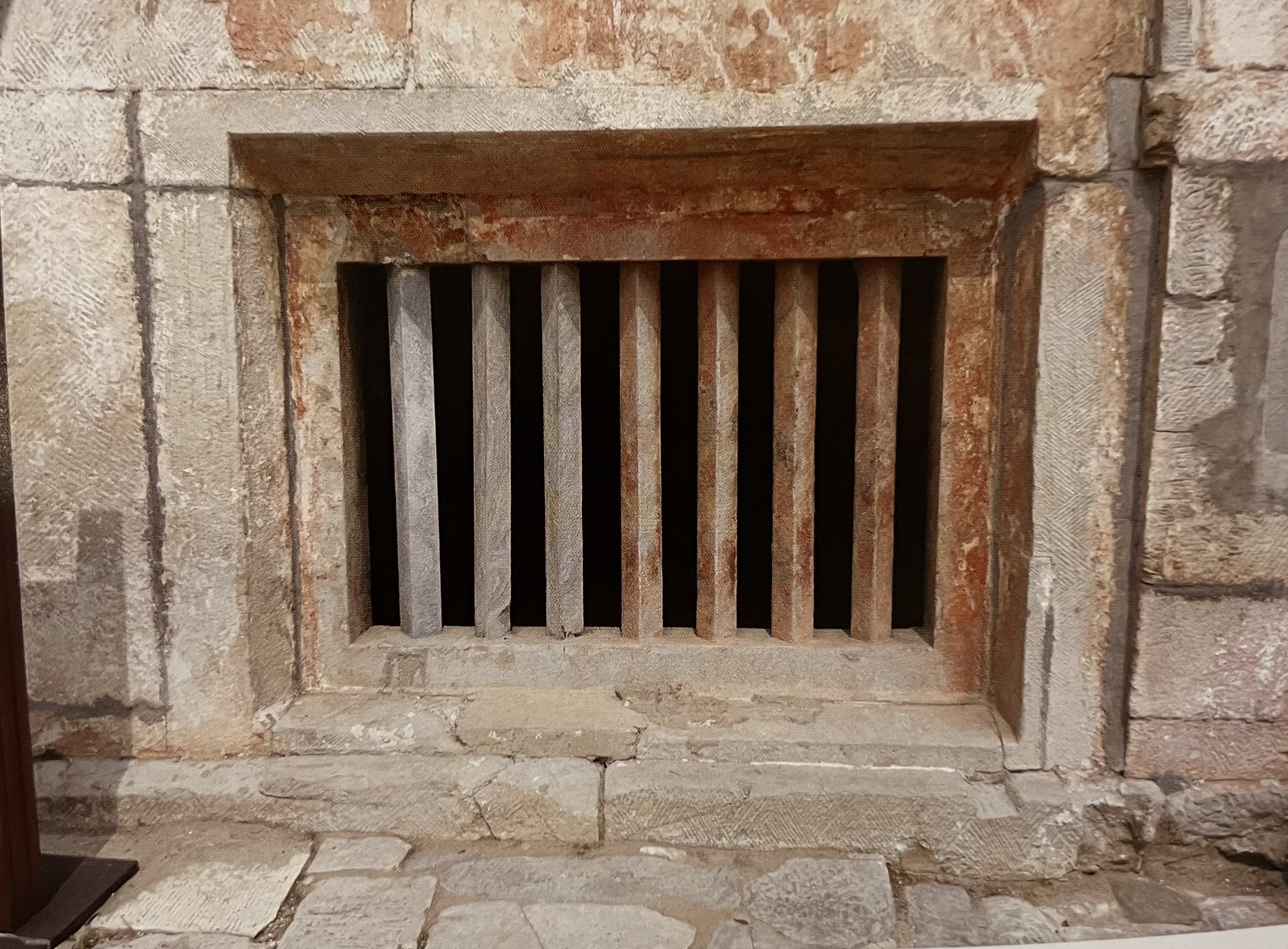
Mullioned windows on Leiyindong, a cave in Sui

During the Sui period in the 7th century, structures were carved in the Hebei mountains. These structures had a quadrilateral ground plan with intent for a cubic interior. Pillars inside would be octagonal. Another feature included mullioned windows. Plus, there were anterooms, which were small Buddhist caves.

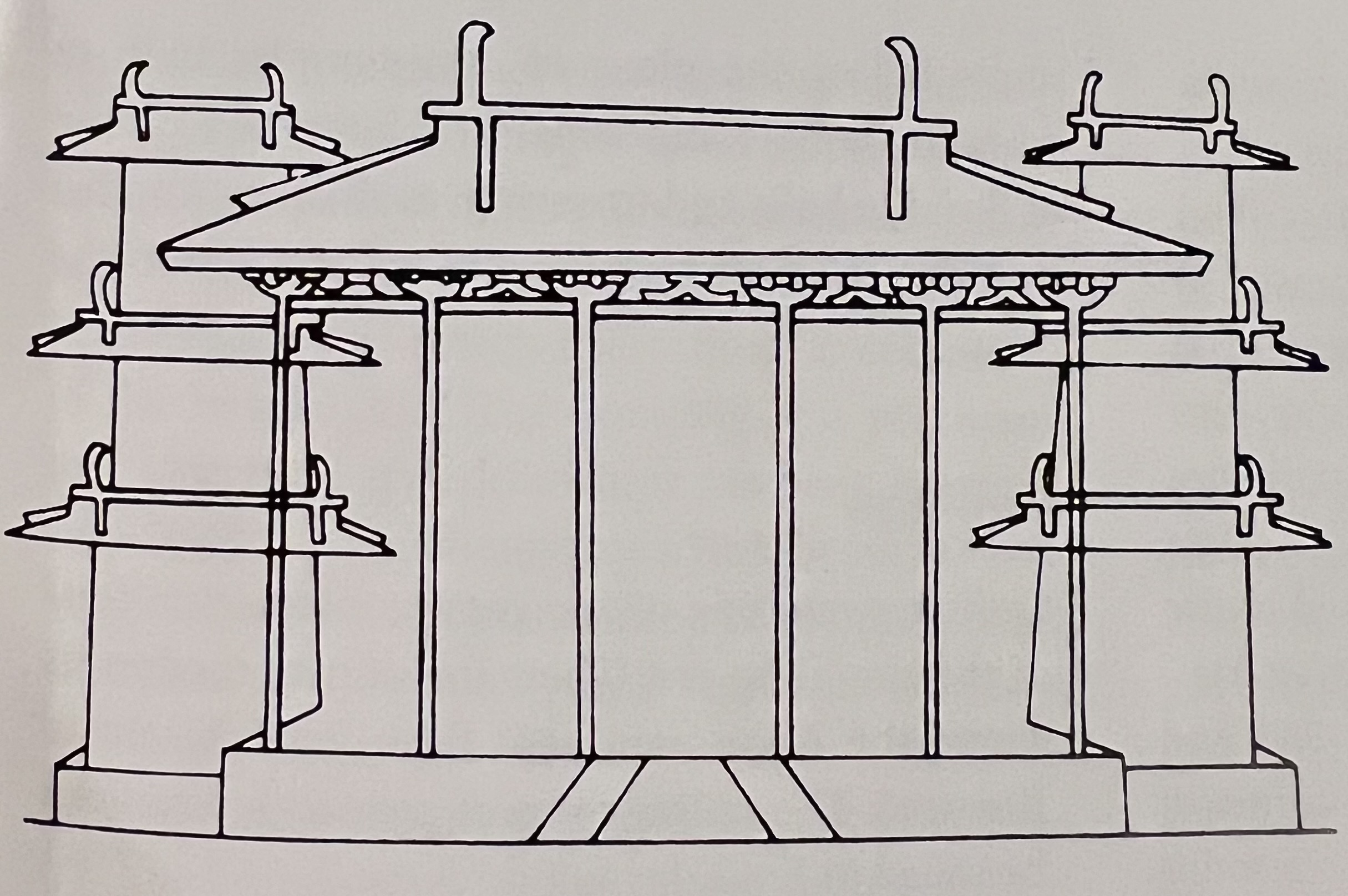
Architecture of Sui Cave

=== Yaodong architecture ===
The Jin Chinese cultural area of Shanxi and northern Shaanxi is noted for carving homes into the sides of mountains. The soft rock of the Loess Plateau in this region makes an excellent insulating material.

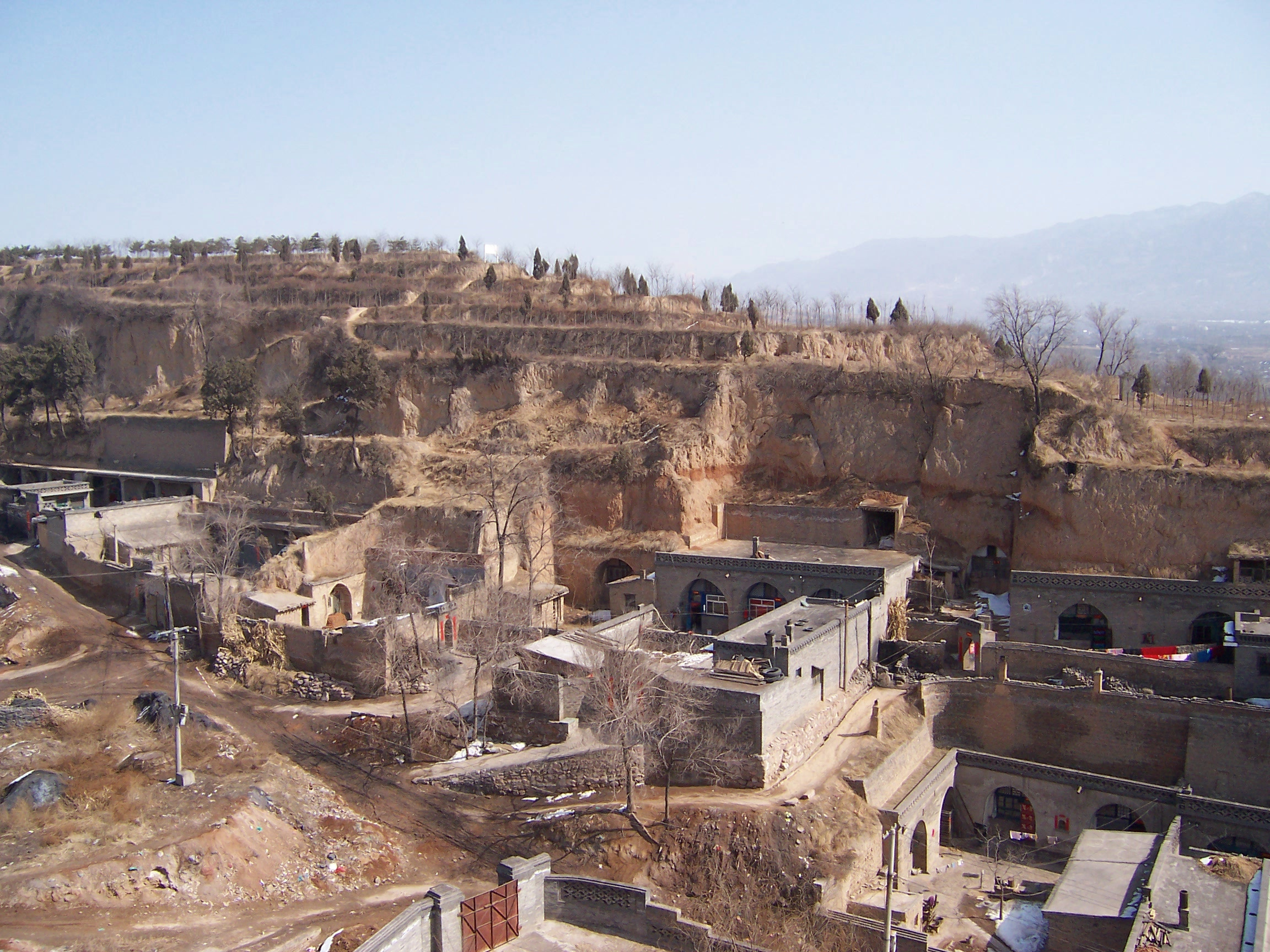

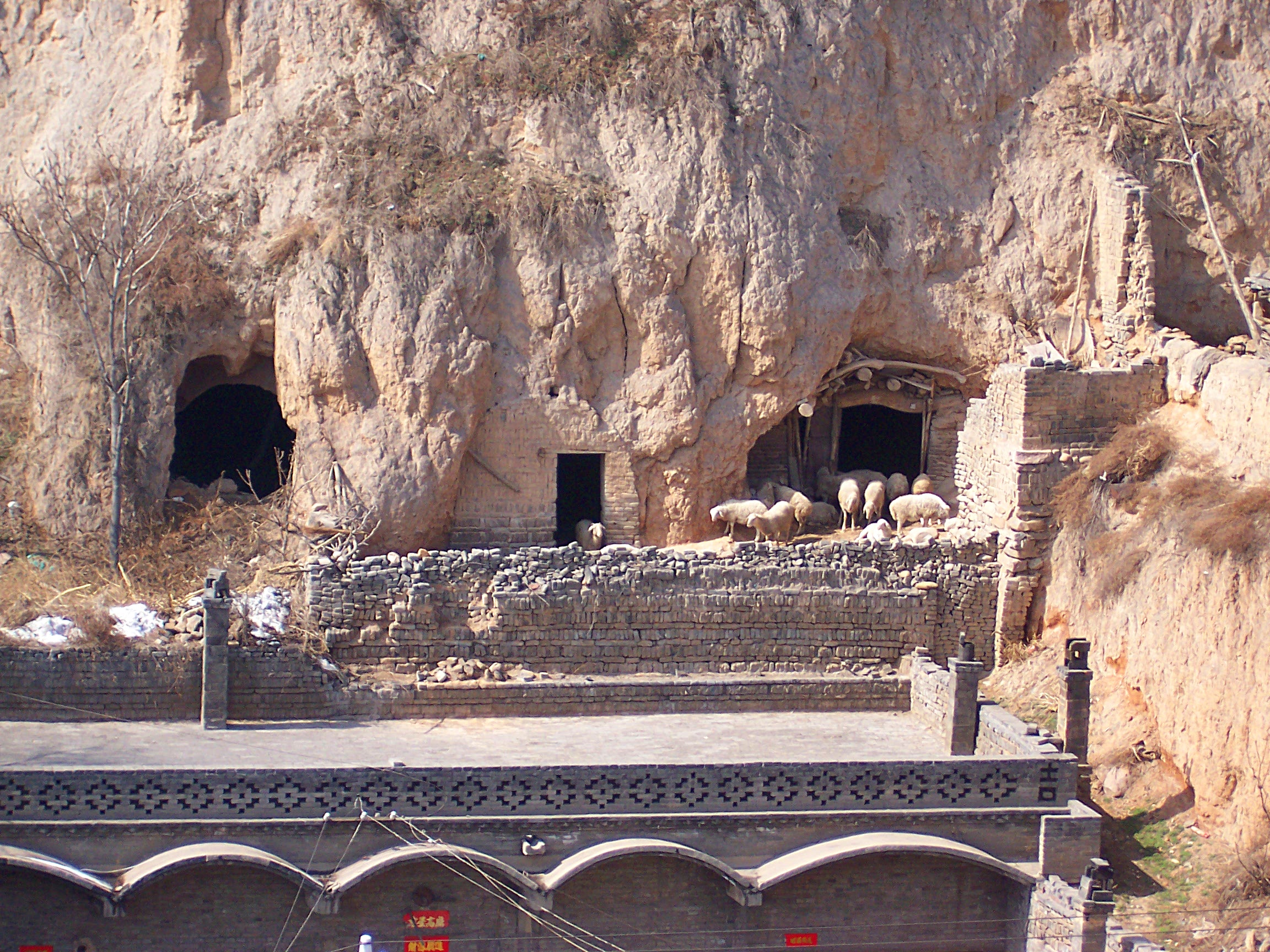

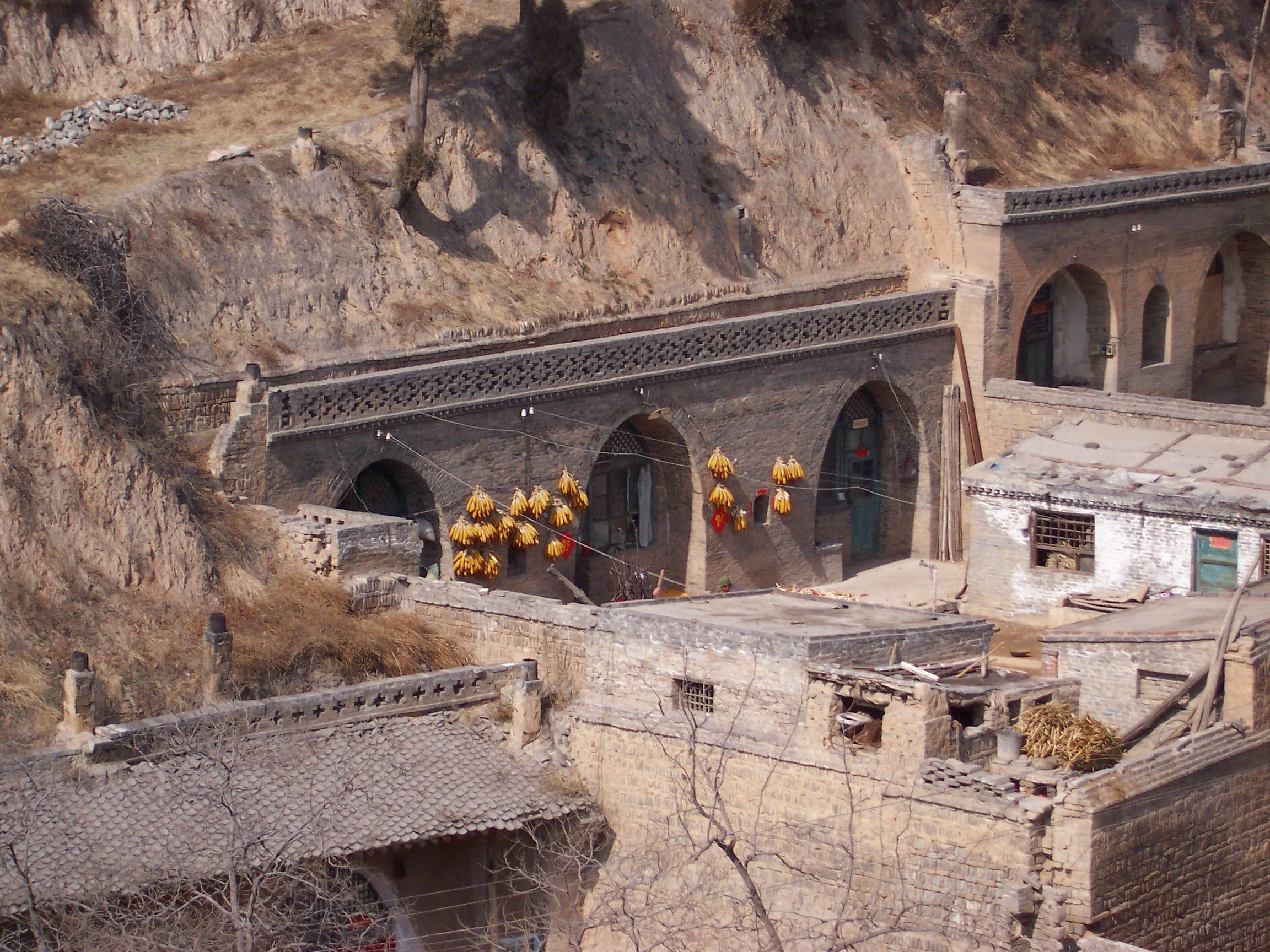

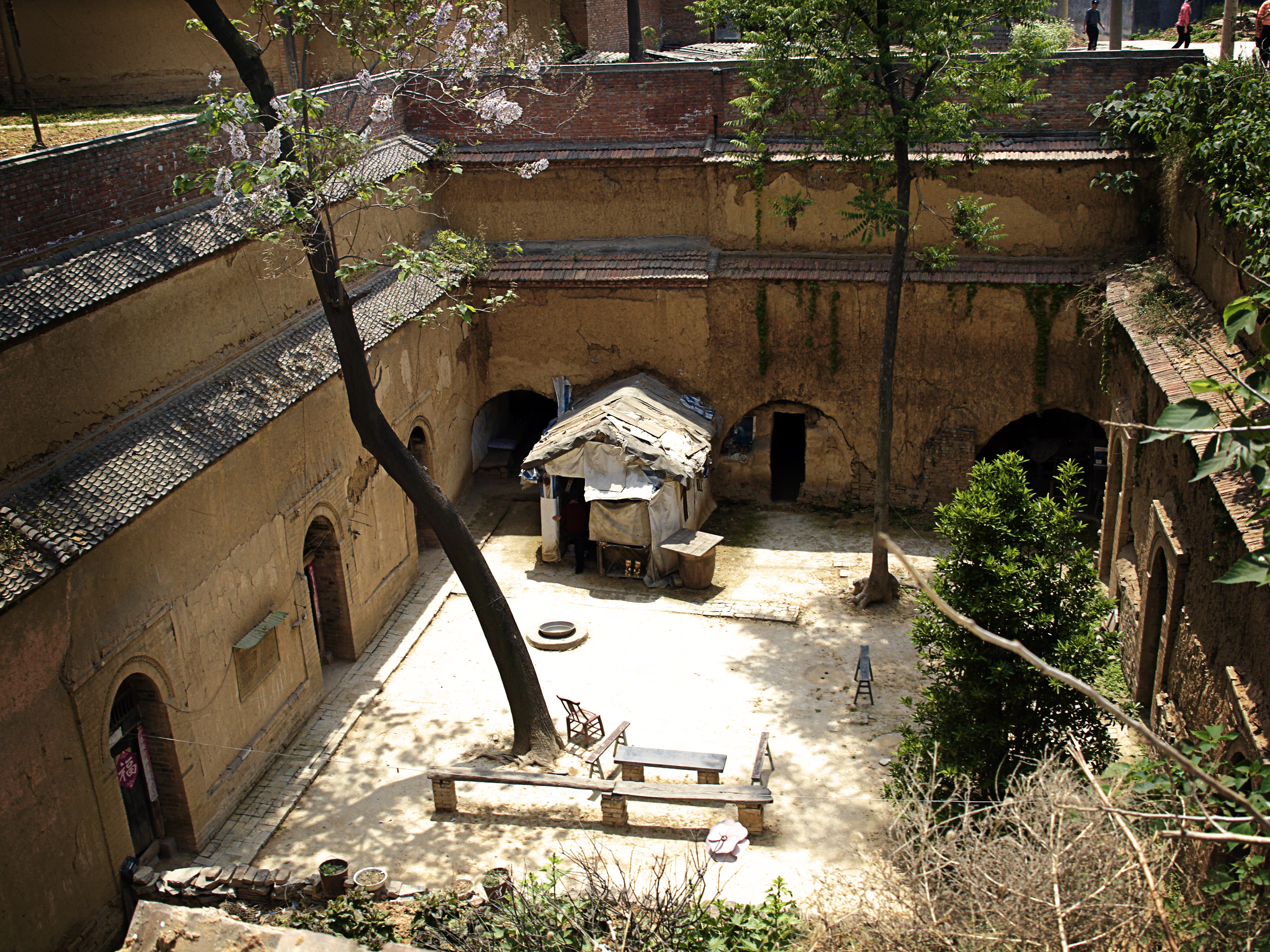

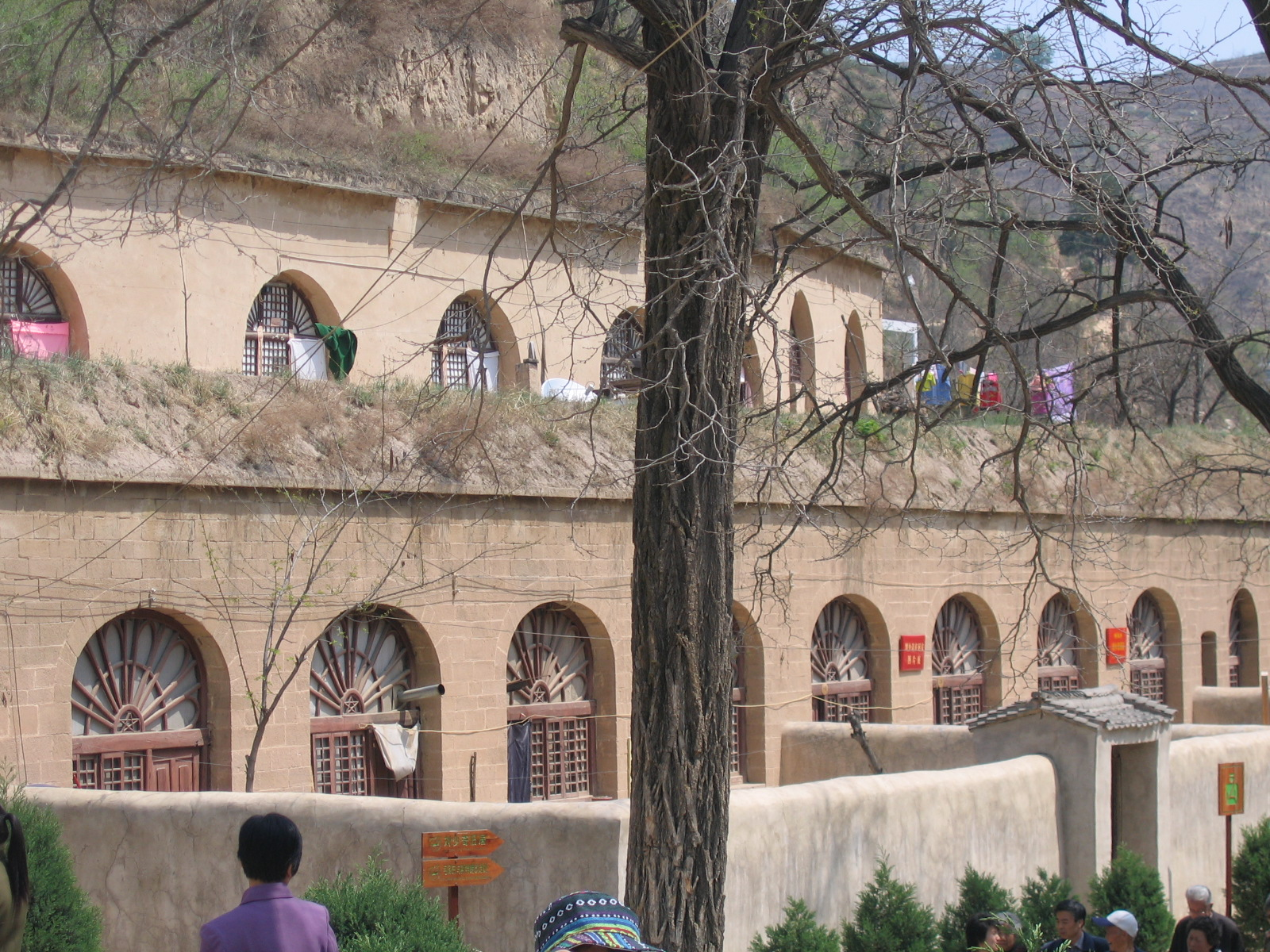

=== Xinjiang architecture ===
Early architecture

Early Xinjiang architecture was influenced by Buddhist, Manichaean, Sogdian, Uyghur and Chinese cultural groups, most prominent examples including the cave temples of Bezeklik; religious and residential buildings at Jiahoe; and temples and shrines at Gaochang.

Islamic architecture

The first Muslims came to Xinjiang in the eighth or ninth centuries CE, yet only became a significant presence during the Yuan dynasty.

Islam came to Hami province in eastern Xinjiang at the end of the fourteenth century, and the province's first mosque was built in 1490, with ten generations of Muslim kings of Hami buried in the complex from the 1690s to 1932. The mausoleum complex of Hami was built in 1840 – the tomb of King Boxi'er is the complex's most prominent feature, having been constructed after the Muslim rebellion of 1867.

The mud-brick Emin Minaret (or Sugongta) in Turpan province is 44 metres (144 ft) tall is the tallest minaret in China. The tower is decorated with sixteen patterns on the exterior, with textured bricks carved into intricate, repetitive, geometric and floral mosaic patterns, such as stylized flowers and rhombuses. The minaret was started in 1777 during the reign of the Qianlong Emperor (r. 1735–1796) and was completed only one year later.

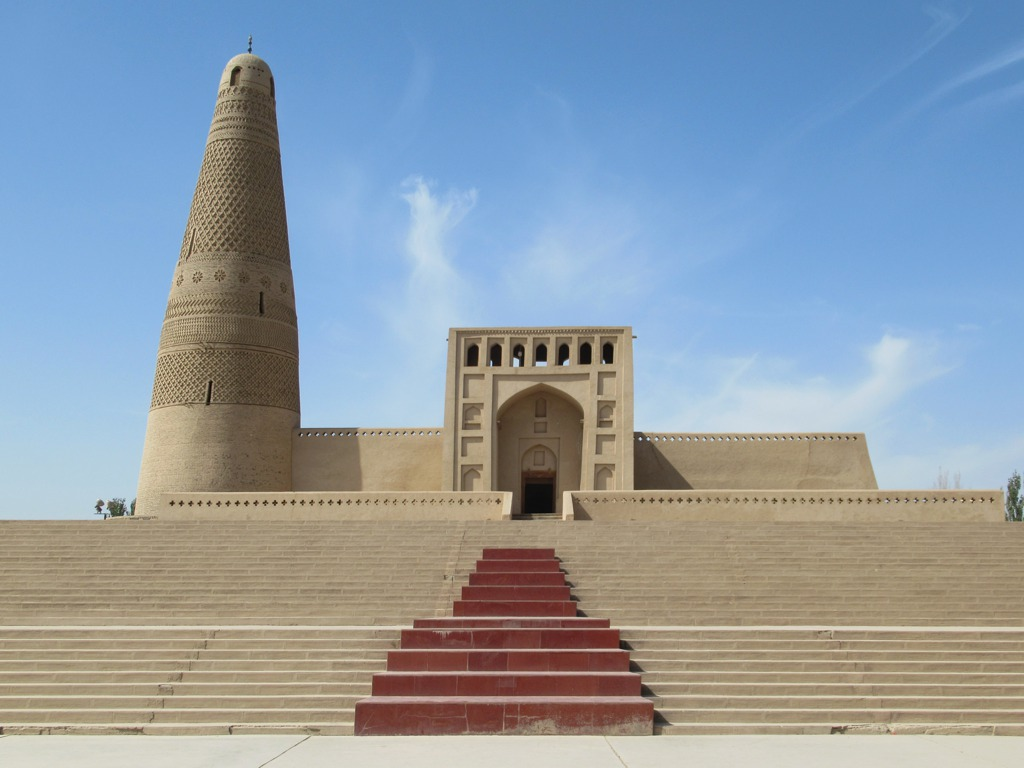
Emin Minaret

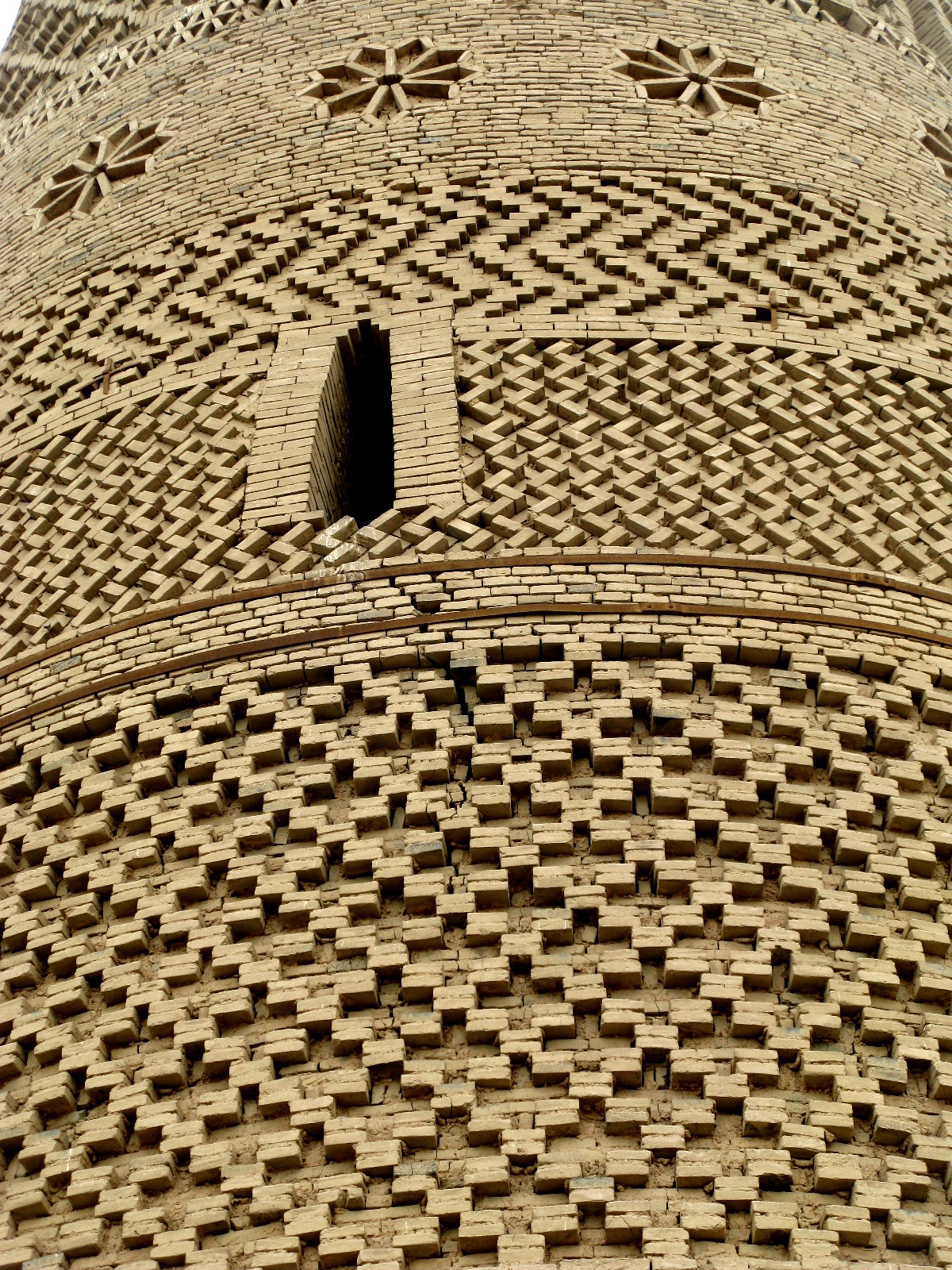
Emin Minaret (detail)

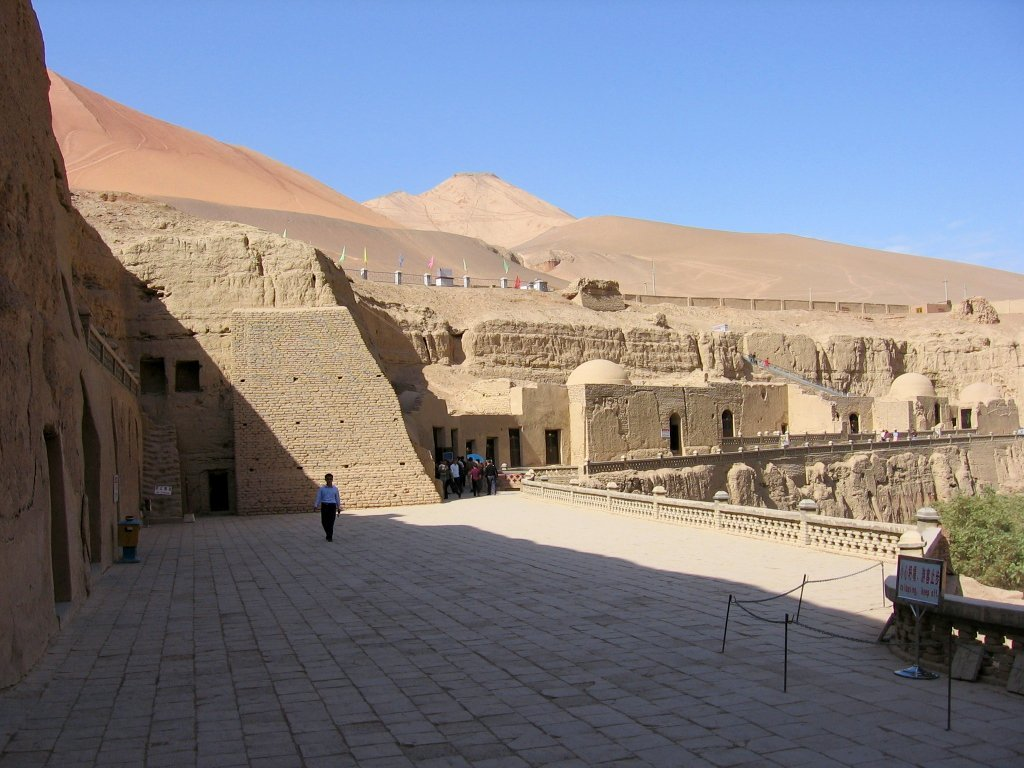
Bezeklik Caves

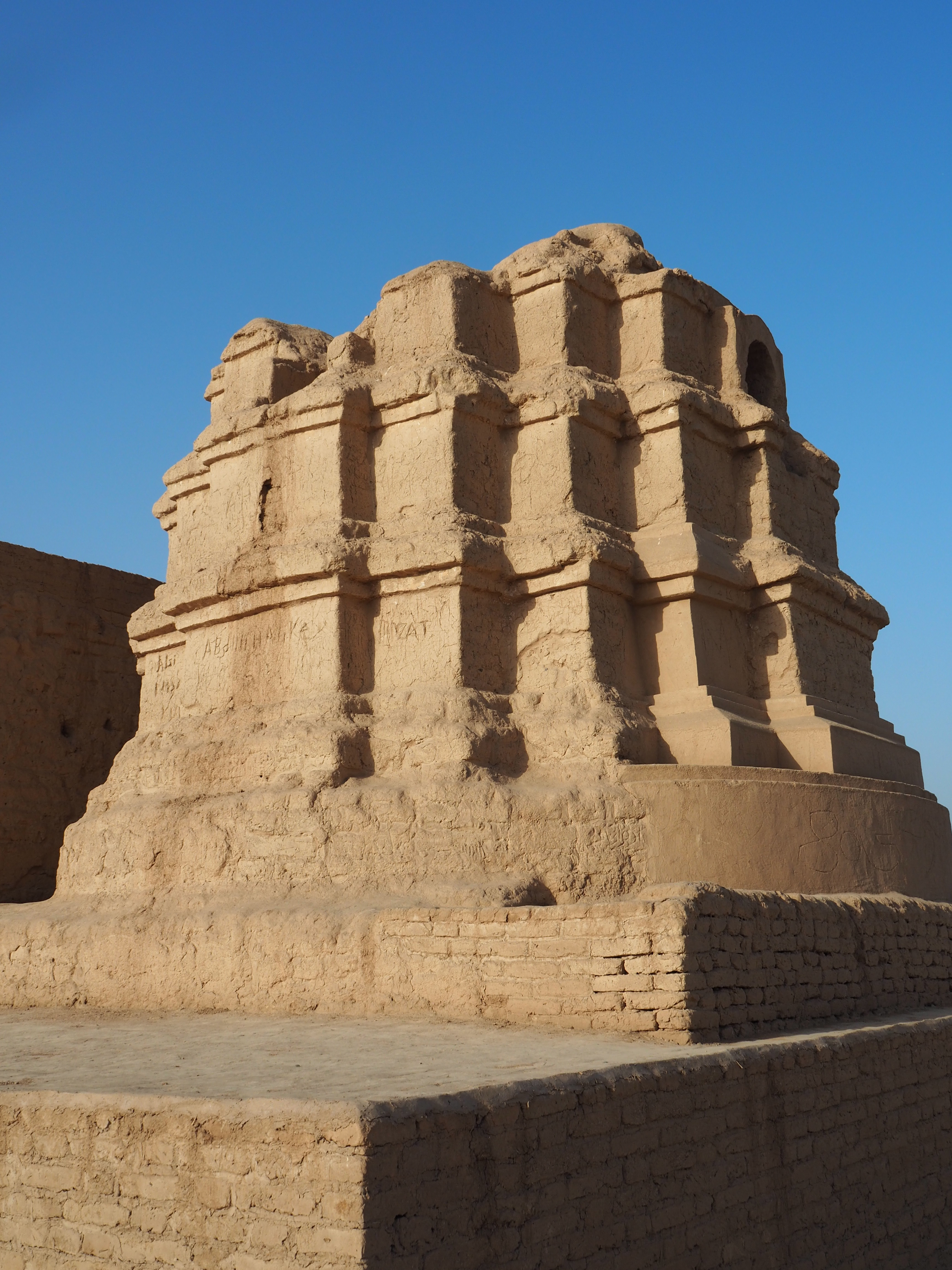
Gaochang

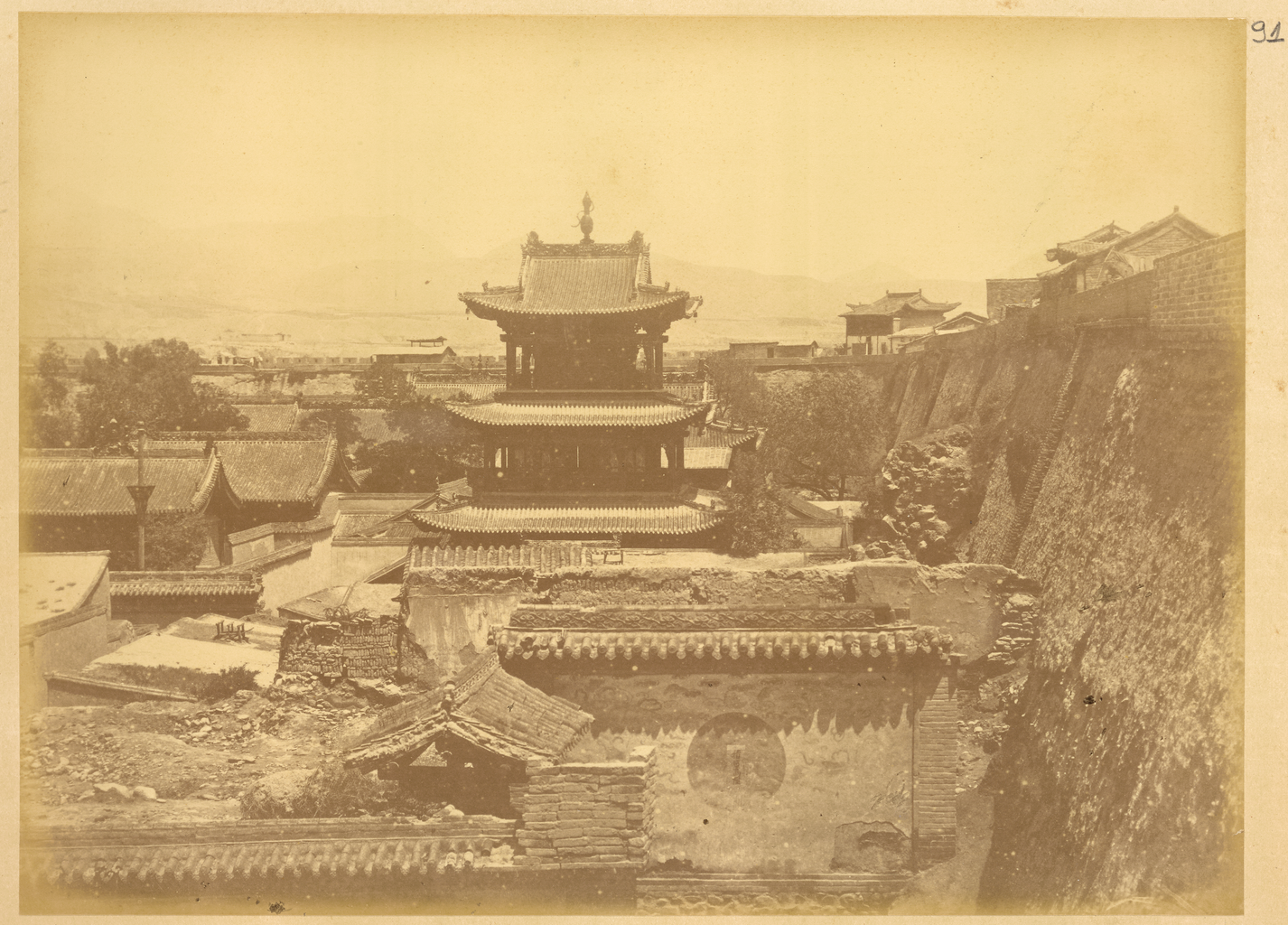
Mosque in Hami's Muslim District, Xinjiang, China, 1875

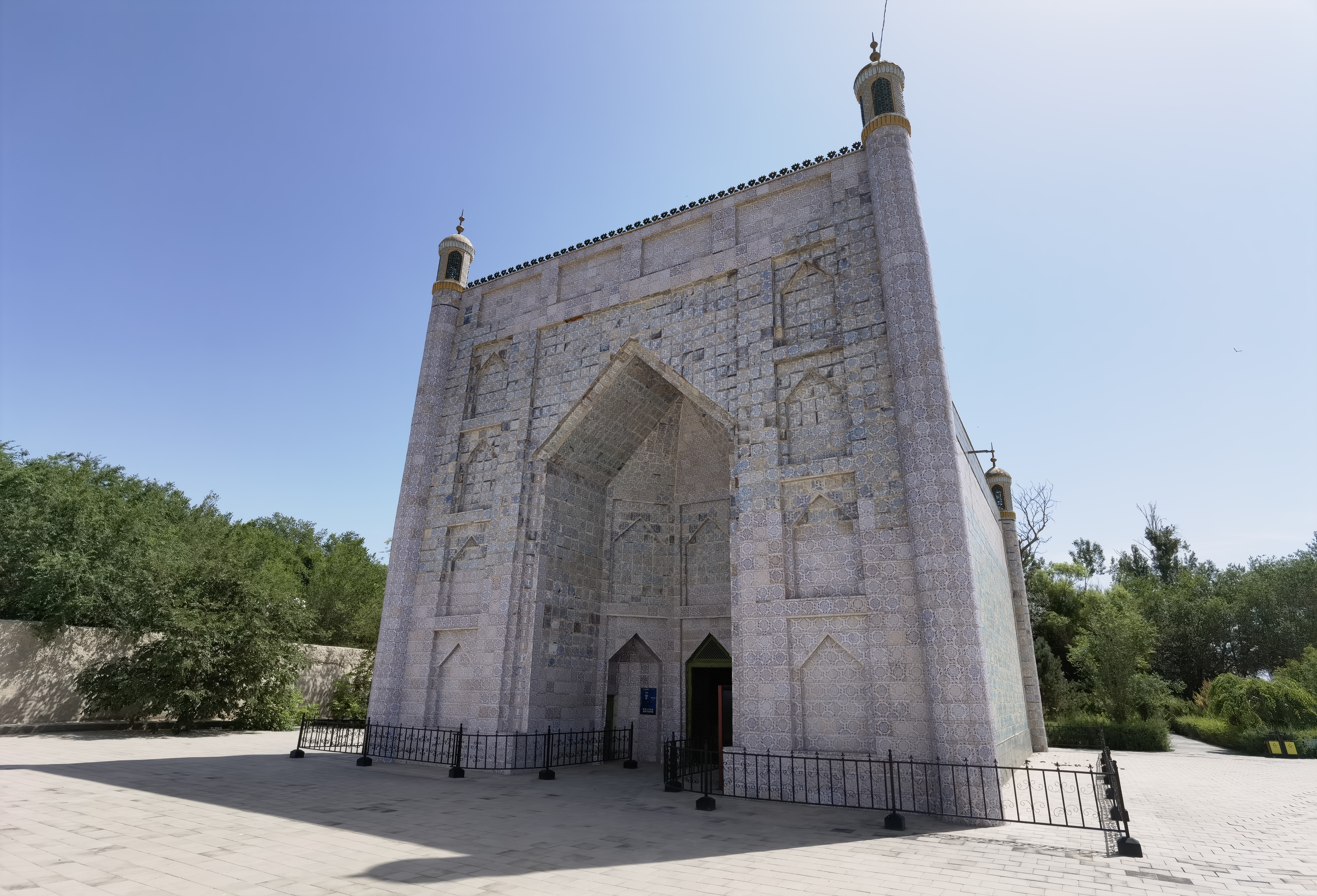
Mausoleum of King Box'ier in Hami, constructed 1867-68

=== Others ===
Other regional styles include Hutong, found in northern China, Longtang and Shikumen of Haipai (Shanghainese) architecture.

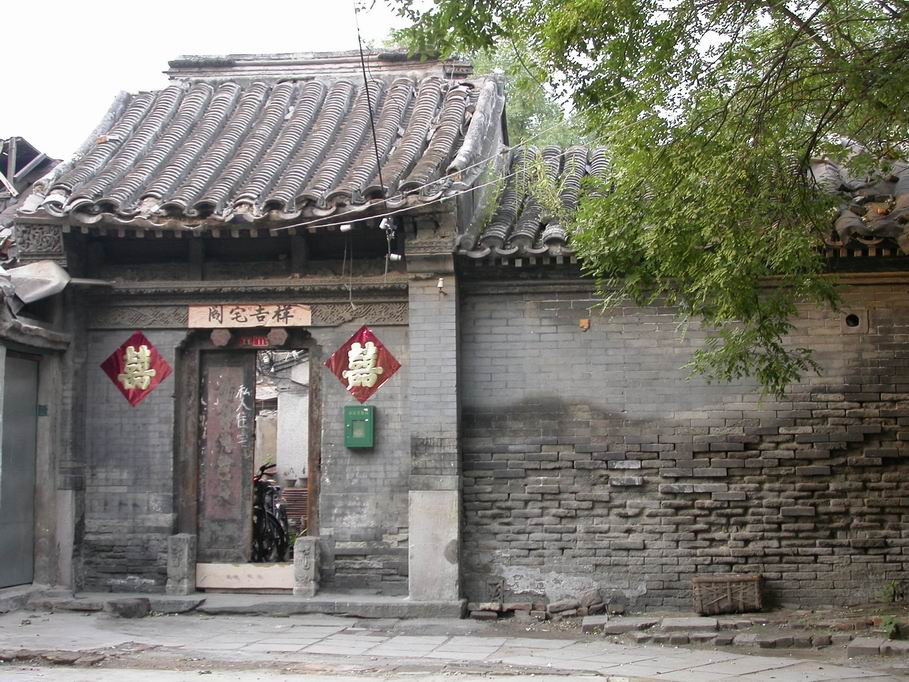
Entrance to a residence in a hutong.

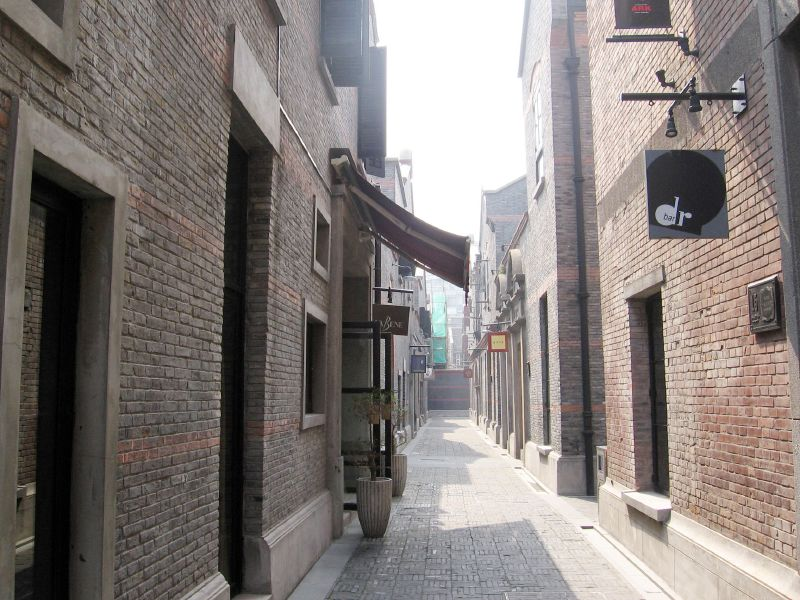
Shikumen in Xintiandi lanes in Shanghai.

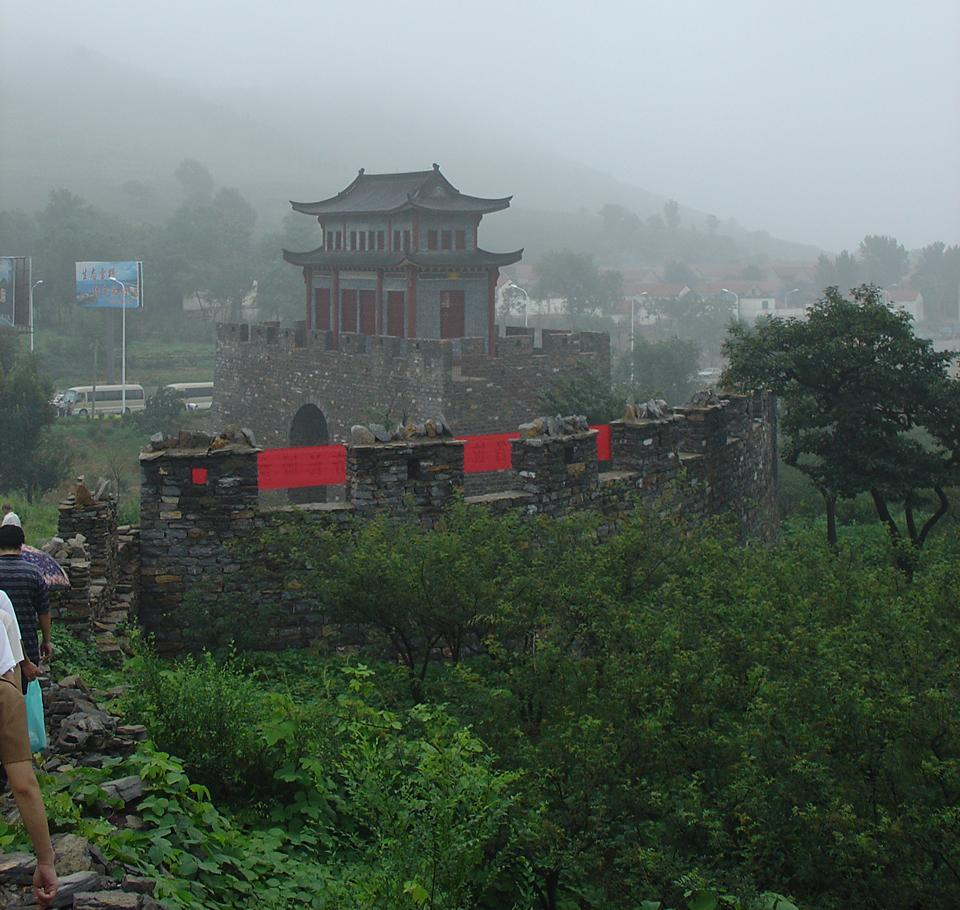
Great Wall of Qi in Shandong.

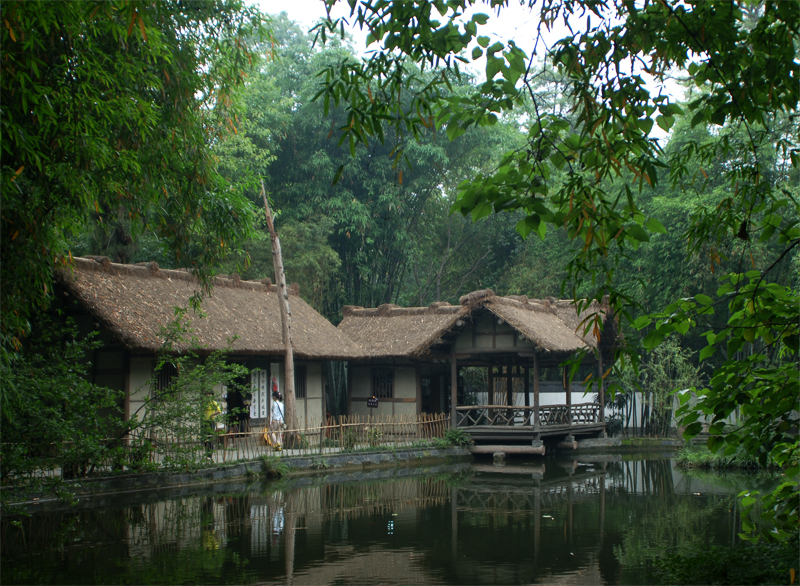
Du Fu Thatched Cottage in Sichuan.

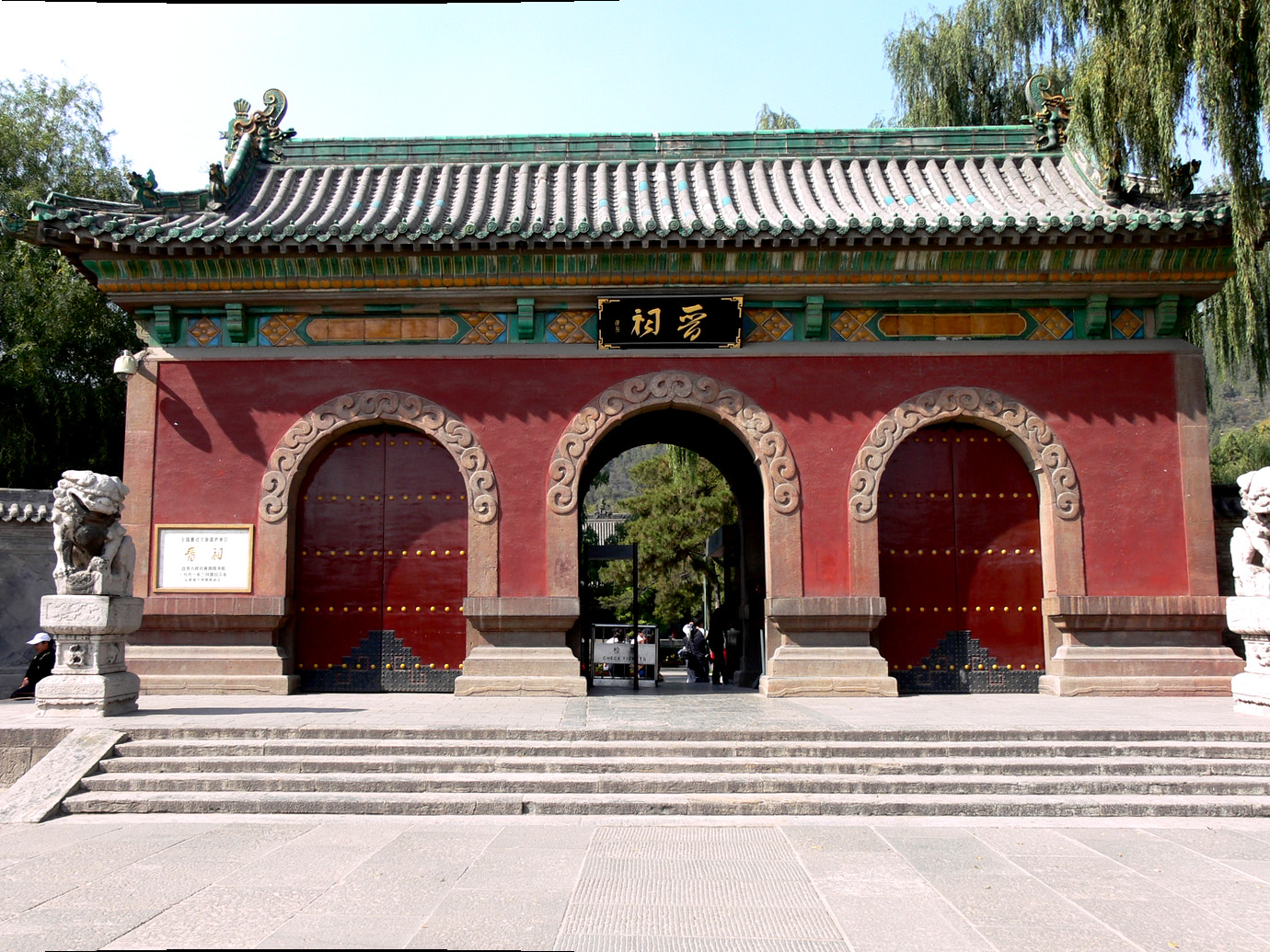
Jinci in the Jin Chinese-speaking province of Shanxi.

== See also ==
- Ancient Chinese wooden architecture
- Architecture of the Song dynasty
- Architecture of Hong Kong
- Architecture of Penang
- Chinese garden
- Chinese pagodas
- Caihua
- Feng Shui
- Hutong
- Imperial roof decoration
- Imperial guardian lions
- Shanghai – for a gallery of modern buildings
- Shikumen
- Siheyuan
- Walled villages of Hong Kong
- Yu Hao
